= Acidophil cell =

Cell type found in the pituitary gland

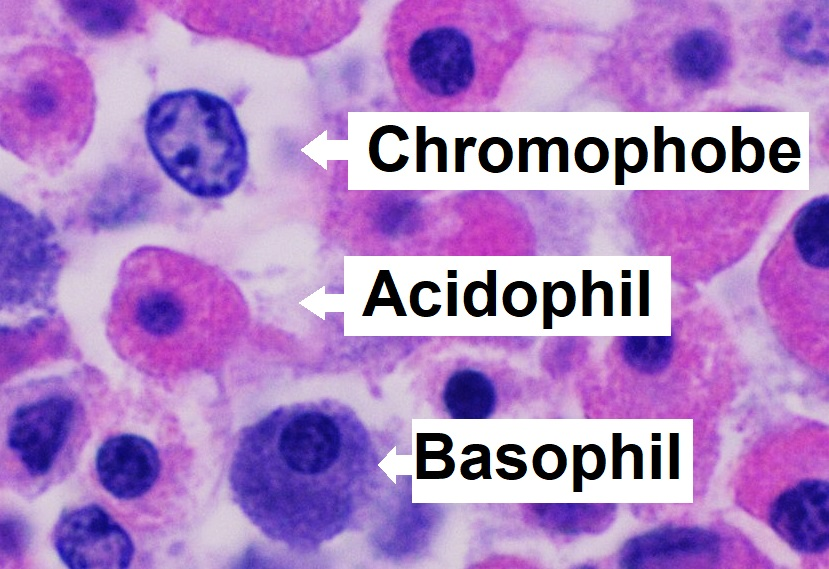
- Microanatomy of the pars distalis of the anterior pituitary, showing chromophobes, basophils, and acidophils

Identifiers
- TH: H3.08.02.2.00020

In the anterior pituitary, the term "acidophil" is used to describe two different types of cells which stain well with acidic dyes.

- Somatotrophs, which secrete growth hormone (a peptide hormone)
- Lactotrophs, which secrete prolactin (a peptide hormone)

When using standard staining techniques, they cannot be distinguished from each other (though they can be distinguished from basophils and chromophobes), and are therefore identified simply as "acidophils".

== See also ==
- Eosinophilic
- Acidophile (histology)
- Basophilic
- Chromophobe cell

- Melanotroph

- Chromophil

- Basophil cell

- Oxyphil cell
- Oxyphil cell (parathyroid)
- Pituitary gland
- Neuroendocrine cell
