= Basophil cell =

Cell type found in the pituitary gland

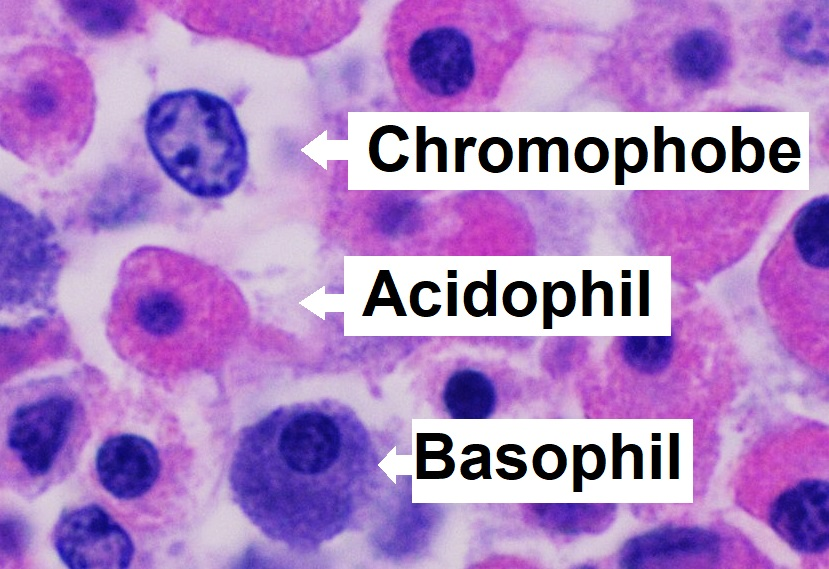
- Microanatomy of the pars distalis of the anterior pituitary, showing chromophobes, basophils, and acidophils

Details
- Location: Anterior pituitary

Identifiers
- TH: H3.08.02.2.00023

An anterior pituitary basophil is a type of cell in the anterior pituitary which manufactures hormones.

It is called a basophil because it is basophilic (readily takes up bases), and typically stains a relatively deep blue or purple.

These basophils are further classified by the hormones they produce. (It is usually not possible to distinguish between these cell types using standard staining techniques.)

Cell name	Relative proportion	Hormone produced	Hypothalamic regulators
Corticotrophs	15%	ACTH	CRH
Gonadotrophs	10%	FSH, LH and hCG*	GnRH
Thyrotrophs	5%	TSH	TRH

*Produced only in pregnancy by the developing embryo.

== See also ==
- Chromophobe cell

- Melanotroph

- Chromophil

- Acidophil cell

- Oxyphil cell
- Oxyphil cell (parathyroid)
- Pituitary gland
- Neuroendocrine cell
- Basophilic
