= Rathke's pouch =

Feature in embryogenesis

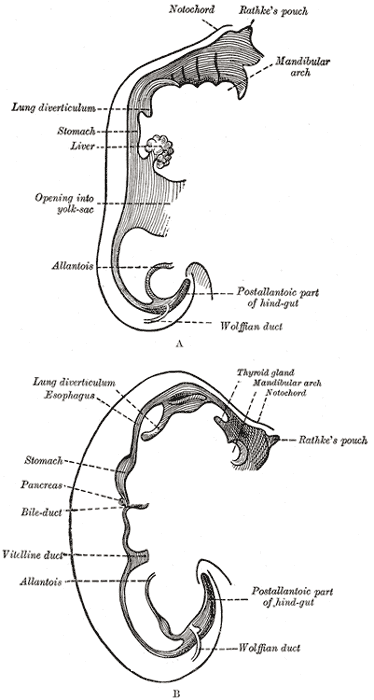
- Sketches in profile of two stages in the development of the human digestive tube.

Details
- Carnegie stage: 10
- Gives rise to: Anterior pituitary

Identifiers
- Latin: fovea adenohypophysialis

In embryogenesis, Rathke's pouch is an evagination at the roof of the developing mouth in front of the buccopharyngeal membrane. It gives rise to the anterior pituitary (adenohypophysis), a part of the endocrine system.

== Development ==
Rathke's pouch, and therefore the anterior pituitary, is derived from ectoderm. Rathke's pouch forms during the fourth week of embryonic development. It begins as an ectodermal invagination at the roof of the stomodeum, which extends dorsally towards the developing brain.

The pouch eventually loses its connection with the pharynx giving rise to the anterior pituitary. The anterior wall of Rathke's pouch proliferates, filling most of the pouch to form pars distalis and pars tuberalis. The posterior wall forms pars intermedia.

In some organisms, the proliferating anterior wall does not fully occupy Rathke's pouch, leaving a remnant (Rathke's cleft) between the pars distalis and pars intermedia. This remnant may develop into a large cyst, the Rathke's cleft cyst. This cyst typically doesn't cause symptoms, but, if large enough, it may cause vision loss, bitemporal hemianopsia, blurry vision, and dulled color vision.

== Anatomy and structure ==
Rathke's pouch is a sac-like structure that gives rise to the pars distalis, pars intermedia, and pars tuberalis of the pituitary gland. The cells of Rathke's pouch proliferate and differentiate into various hormone-producing cells, including Somatotrophs, Lactotrophs, Corticotrophs, Thyrotrophs, and Gonadotrophs.

== Clinical significance ==
Rathke's pouch may develop benign cysts. Craniopharyngioma is a neoplasm which can arise from the epithelium within the cleft. Abnormal development of Rathke's pouch can lead to various congenital disorders such as Rathke's cleft cysts. These conditions can result in pituitary dysfunction and present with symptoms such as hormonal imbalances, growth retardation, and visual disturbances.

== Research and future directions ==
Current research on Rathke's pouch focuses on understanding the molecular mechanisms governing its development and differentiation. Advances in genetic and stem cell research hold promise for developing novel therapies for pituitary disorders resulting from Rathke's pouch malformations.

== Eponym ==
It is named for Martin Rathke.

== See also ==
- Rathke's cleft cyst
