= Corticotropic cell =

Basophilic cell in anterior pituitary that produces pro-opiomelanocortin

Details
- Location: Anterior pituitary
- Function: Production of melanocyte-stimulating hormone, adrenocorticotropic hormone (ACTH) and lipotropin

Identifiers
- MeSH: D052680
- TH: H3.08.02.2.00009
- FMA: 83098

Corticotropic cells, (corticotropes or corticotrophs) are basophilic cells in the anterior pituitary that produce pro-opiomelanocortin (POMC) which undergoes cleavage to adrenocorticotropin (ACTH), β-lipotropin (β-LPH), and melanocyte-stimulating hormone (MSH). These cells are stimulated by corticotropin releasing hormone (CRH) and make up 15–20% of the cells in the anterior pituitary. The release of ACTH from the corticotropic cells is controlled by CRH, which is formed in the cell bodies of parvocellular neurosecretory cells within the paraventricular nucleus of the hypothalamus and passes to the corticotropes in the anterior pituitary via the hypophyseal portal system. Adrenocorticotropin hormone stimulates the adrenal cortex to release glucocorticoids and plays an important role in the stress response.

== Function ==
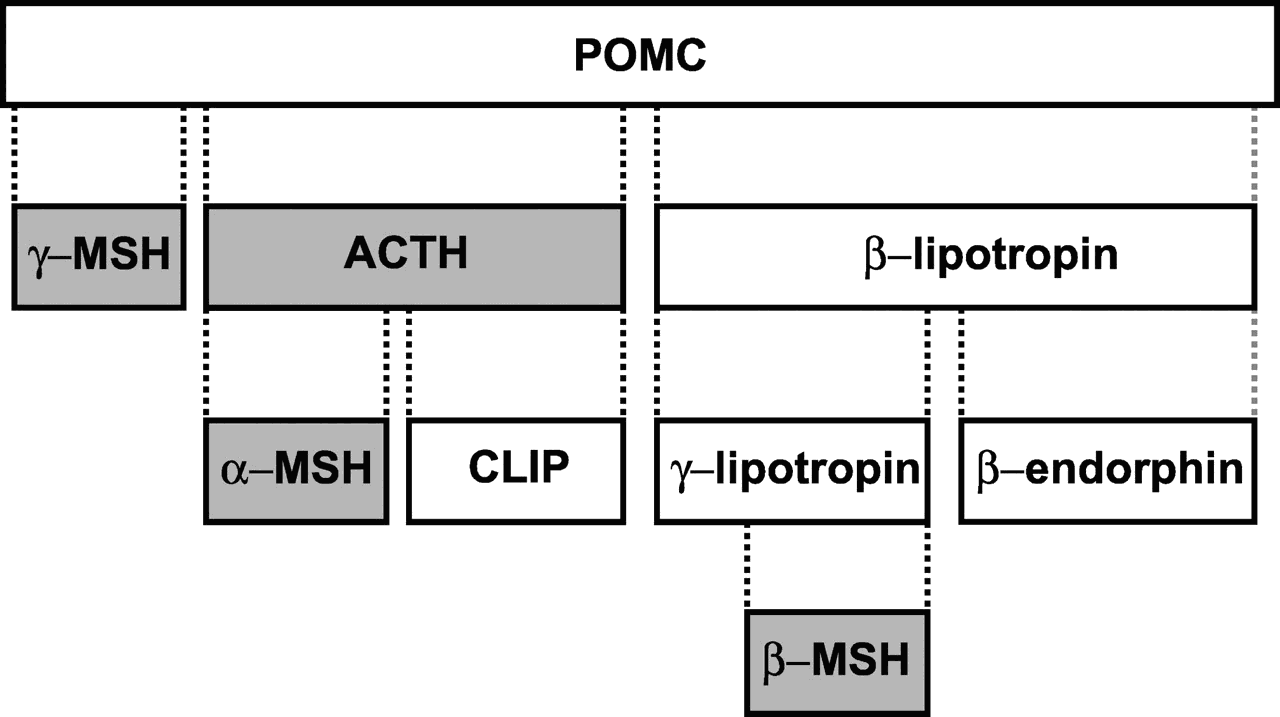
POMC is broken down into several peptide hormones via proteolytic cleavage in the corticotropic cells.

The primary function of the corticotropic cells is to produce the prohormone POMC in response to the release of CRH from the hypothalamus. POMC is cleaved into several peptide hormones via enzyme activity. In addition to synthesis in the corticotropes, POMC is also synthesized in melanotroph cells, the arcuate nucleus of the hypothalamus, and melanocytes. POMC undergoes differential cleavage into various peptide hormones depending on the cell it is synthesized in; it also varies based on species. POMC in the corticotropes of humans is proteolytically cleaved by proprotein convertases into ACTH and β-lipotropin. In rats, however, the ACTH is further cleaved into α-MSH and CLIP in the corticotrope. These peptide hormones are stored within vesicles in the corticotropic cells and are released in response to CRH stimulation from the hypothalamus. These vesicles then leave the anterior pituitary and travel throughout the body via the bloodstream to reach their target tissues.

Hormones Derived from POMC
Hormone(s)	Main Targets	Effects
ACTH	Adrenal cortex	Glucocorticoid synthesis
α-MSH, β-MSH, γ-MSH	Skin Cells (Melanocytes), Brain, Exocrine Glands	Pigmentation of hair and skin, satiety, weight homeostasis
CLIP	Pancreas	Insulin secretagogue, stimulates insulin release
β-lipotropin, γ-lipotropin	Adipose Tissue	Lipolysis, fatty acid mobilization
β-endorphin	Peripheral Nervous System	Pain management

== Role in the Hypothalamic–pituitary–adrenal Axis ==
Corticotropes located in the anterior pituitary are stimulated by the hypothalamus to release ACTH, which then travels via the bloodstream to the adrenal cortex.

=== Stimulation ===
Corticotropic cells serve an important role within the feedback loop of the hypothalamic–pituitary–adrenal (HPA) axis and the stress response. Corticotropes produce and release ACTH, a 39 amino acid peptide hormone, in response to corticotropic releasing hormone (CRH) release from the hypothalamus. CRH is a 41-amino-acid peptide hormone that is secreted by the parvocellular neurosecretory cells, which are found within the paraventricular nucleus of the hypothalamus.

Stimuli for the release of CRH from the hypothalamus include:

- Forskolin
- Interleukin-6
- Pituitary adenylate cyclase-activating peptide (PACAP)
- Stress or trauma
- Circadian rhythms

Forskolin and PACAP regulate the synthesis of CRH in the hypothalamus by binding to G protein-coupled receptors and stimulating and increase in cAMP within the cells via the action of adenylate cyclase. This activates the protein kinase A pathway, which results in the binding of cAMP response element binding protein (CREB) onto the CRH promoter region and induces transcription of CRH. This process is repressed by glucocorticoids; this inhibitory feedback helps maintain homeostasis of the stress response.

Once released by the hypothalamus, CRH travels through the hypophyseal portal system to the anterior pituitary, where it binds to G protein-coupled receptors on the corticotropic cell membrane and stimulates cAMP production. The effects of CRH on pituitary corticotropes are potentiated by vasopressin (AVP); AVP is a weak inducer of ACTH production on its own, but has a strong synergistic effect on ACTH production when CRH is also bound to the receptor. These signaling hormones act via signal transduction, causing the synthesis of POMC and eventual cleavage to ACTH and β-lipotropin. These peptide hormones are then released into the bloodstream, where they circulate and act on target tissues.

=== Function ===
ACTH released from the corticotropes binds to G protein-coupled receptors in the adrenal cortex, where it stimulates the production of glucocorticoids (primarily cortisol). ACTH binds to the melanocortin 2 receptor and, through signal transduction, increases levels of cholesterol esterase, the transport of cholesterol across the mitochondrial membrane, cholesterol binding to P450SCC and, an increase in pregnenolone synthesis. It also serves as a secondary stimulus for the synthesis of mineralocorticoids such as aldosterone, which serve an important role in regulating the salt balance of the blood. Glucocorticoids released by the adrenal cortex inhibit production of CRH and ACTH, forming a negative feedback loop.

=== Inhibition of ACTH production ===
Corticotropes contain glucocorticoid receptors (GRs) and corticosteroid-binding globulin (CBG, or transcortin). GR is a nuclear receptor that inhibits transcription of ACTH via a negative glucocorticoid recognition element (GRE) that binds cortisol on POMC DNA, but generally transcortin binds glucocorticoids (including cortisol, cortisone, deoxycortisone, and aldosterone) with high affinity and prevents this inhibition. Tonic inhibition of corticotropes requires high concentrations of glucocorticoids, exceeding CBG capacity. This causes ACTH secretion to be vulnerable to inhibition in patients taking glucocorticoids for medical purposes such as treatment of autoimmune disease or as an anti-transplant-rejection medication.

== Associated diseases ==
=== Cushing's Disease ===
Corticotropic cells can have detrimental effects on the body if they express too much or too little ACTH. One such example is Cushing's disease, which can result from overproduction of ACTH in the corticotropes due to pituitary tumors known as corticotroph adenomas; this is the cause for roughly two-thirds of those diagnosed with Cushing's disease. It is also possible that this disease can result from production of ACTH in a non-pituitary tumor, known as ectopic production, or the adrenal glands can overproduce cortisol due to an adrenal tumor. This overproduction of ACTH causes an increase in cortisol levels due to increased glucocorticoid synthesis in the adrenal cortex resulting in several associated symptoms.

Symptoms of Cushing's disease include:

- Fatty deposits in the neck or back
- Stretch marks (striae)
- Fatigue
- Osteoporosis
- Weakened immune system
- Hypertension

=== Addison's Disease ===
Corticotropic cells can also be the cause of Addison's disease in some instances. Addison's disease is characterized adrenal insufficiency, which is defined as the underproduction of glucocorticoids by the adrenal cortex. If the corticotropes underproduce ACTH this can result in secondary adrenal insufficiency, causing the adrenal glands to underproduce cortisol. This can be caused by tumors of the anterior pituitary or hypothalamus, inflammation, or surgery. This ultimately results in the underproduction of cortisol, which has many detrimental symptoms.

Symptoms of Addison's disease include:

- Weight loss
- Hypoglycemia
- Hypotension
- Irritability

== See also ==
- Neuroendocrinology
- Pituitary gland
- Somatotropic cell
- Lactotropic cell
- Somatomammotropic cell
- Gonadotropic cell
- Thyrotropic cell
- List of distinct cell types in the adult human body
