= Pars intermedia =

Boundary between the anterior and posterior lobes of the pituitary

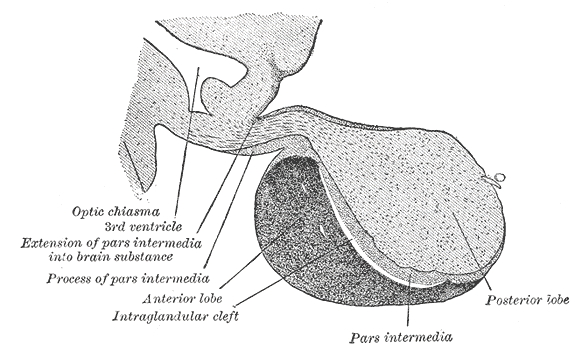
- Median sagittal through the hypophysis of an adult monkey. (Pars intermedia labeled at bottom center.)

Details

Identifiers
- Latin: pars intermedia adenohypophysis
- TA98: A11.1.00.004; A09.4.02.017
- TA2: 3858
- TH: H3.08.02.2.00007
- FMA: 74632

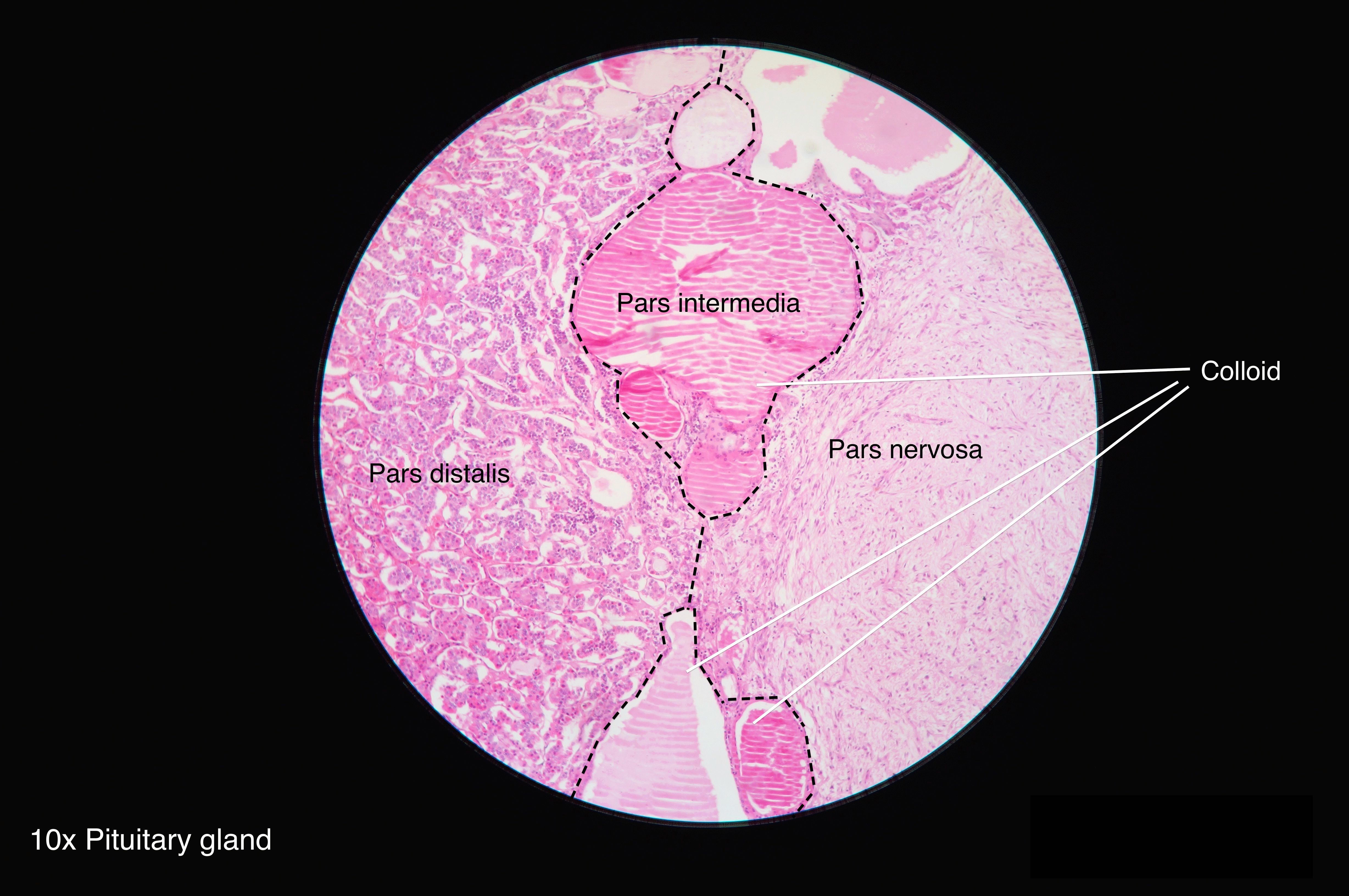
Pars intermedia is seen between pars distalis and pars nervosa.

The pars intermedia is one of the three parts of the pituitary gland. It is a section of tissue sometimes called a middle or intermediate lobe, between the pars distalis, and the posterior pituitary. It is a small region that is largely without blood supply. The cells in the pars intermedia are large and pale. They surround follicles that contain a colloidal matrix.

The pars intermedia secretes α-melanocyte-stimulating hormone (α-MSH), and corticotropin-like intermediate peptide. It appears to be tonically inhibited by the hypothalamus.

In the human fetus, this area produces melanocyte stimulating hormone (MSH) which causes the release of melanin produced in melanocytes that can give a darker skin pigmentation. In the adult the pars intermedia is either very small or entirely absent.

In less developed vertebrates the pars intermedia is much larger, and structurally and functionally more well defined. In some animals including amphibians it mediates active camouflage, causing darkening of the skin when placed against a darker background.

== Anatomy ==
=== Microanatomy ===
It contains colloid-filled cysts and two types of cells - basophils and chromophobes. The cysts are the remainder of Rathke's pouch. As technically part of the anterior pituitary, it separates the posterior pituitary and pars distalis. It is composed of large, pale cells that encompass the aforementioned colloid-filled follicles.

== Physiology ==
The pars intermedia appears to be tonically inhibited by stimuli from the hypothalamus (either by dopaminergic innervation or by vascular mechanism) as experimental sectioning of the pars intermedia from the hypothalamus has been noted to result in hypertrophy of the pars intermedia in various animals.

=== Function ===
The pars intermedia is responsible for secreting α-melanocyte-stimulating hormone, and corticotropin-like intermediate peptide.

It is prominent only during the fetal stage and is otherwise negligible. The characteristic pattern of skin hyperpigmentation seen during pregnancy may be a result of increased circulating maternal a-MSH (which may have originated from either the maternal or fetal pars intermedia), but a-MSH secretion does not seem to be involved in skin tanning in response to light exposure.

== Other animals ==
In lower vertebrates (fish, amphibians), MSH from the pars intermedia is responsible for darkening of the skin, often in response to changes in background color. This color change is due to MSH stimulating the dispersion of melanin pigment in the animal's skin melanocyte chromatophores. Some animals will thus increase a-MSH secretion when placed against a dark background as a means of active camouflage.
