= Follistatin =

Mammalian protein found in Homo sapiens

FST
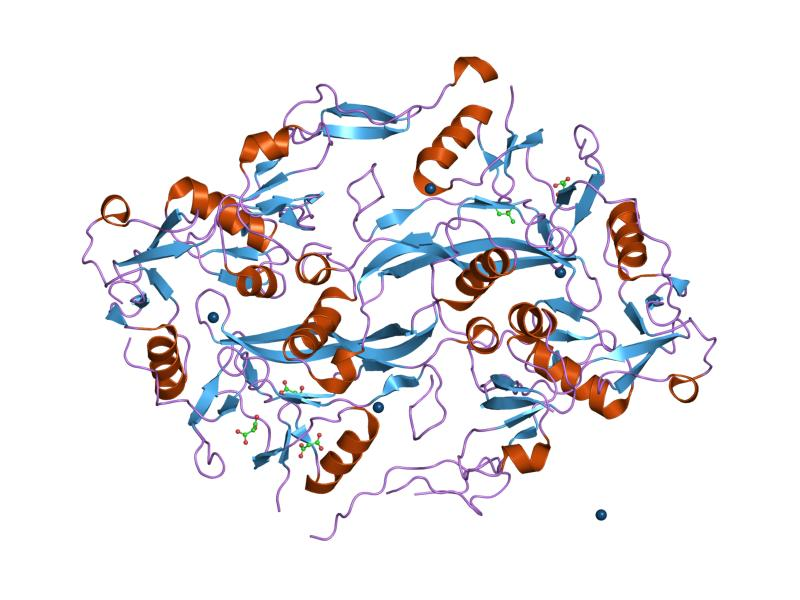

Identifiers
- Aliases: FST, FS, follistatin
- External IDs: OMIM: 136470; MGI: 95586; GeneCards: FST
Available structures
PDB	Ortholog search: PDBe RCSB
PDB	List of PDB id codes 3HH2, 2B0U, 2P6A

Gene location (Human)
Chr.	Chromosome 5 (human)
Band	5q11.2	Start	53,480,626 bp
Band	5q11.2	End	53,487,134 bp

Gene location (Mouse)
Chr.	Chromosome 13 (mouse)
Band	13|13 D2.2	Start	114,588,826 bp
Band	13|13 D2.2	End	114,595,487 bp
RNA expression pattern
Bgee	Human / Mouse (ortholog); Top expressed in: stromal cell of endometrium; buccal mucosa cell; right lobe of liver; oocyte; secondary oocyte; mucosa of urinary bladder; Achilles tendon; pericardium; subcutaneous adipose tissue; gastric mucosa / Top expressed in: cumulus cell; gastrula; primitive streak; endothelial cell of lymphatic vessel; stroma of bone marrow; calvaria; ovary; decidua; epiblast; lumbar spinal ganglion; More reference expression data
BioGPS	n/a
Gene ontology
Molecular function	heparan sulfate proteoglycan binding; protein binding; signal transducer activity; activin binding; activin receptor antagonist activity
Cellular component	extracellular region
Biological process	positive regulation of hair follicle development; negative regulation of activin receptor signaling pathway; negative regulation of transcription by RNA polymerase II; hematopoietic progenitor cell differentiation; signal transduction
Sources:Amigo / QuickGO
Orthologs
Databases	NCBI: entry; OMA: entry
Species	Human	Mouse
Entrez	10468	14313
Ensembl	ENSG00000134363	ENSMUSG00000021765
UniProt	P19883	P47931
RefSeq (mRNA)	NM_006350; NM_013409	NM_008046; NM_001301373; NM_001301375
RefSeq (protein)	NP_006341; NP_037541	NP_001288302; NP_001288304; NP_032072
Location (UCSC)	Chr 5: 53.48 – 53.49 Mb	Chr 13: 114.59 – 114.6 Mb
PubMed search
- Wikidata
View/Edit Human	View/Edit Mouse

Follistatin, also known as activin-bindings protein, is a protein that in humans is encoded by the FST gene. Follistatin is an autocrine glycoprotein that is expressed in nearly all tissues of higher animals.

Its primary function is the binding and bioneutralization of members of the TGF-β superfamily, with a particular focus on activin, a paracrine hormone.

An earlier name for the same protein was FSH-suppressing protein (FSP). At the time of its initial isolation from follicular fluid, it was found to inhibit the anterior pituitary's secretion of follicle-stimulating hormone (FSH).

== Isoforms ==
Three isoforms, FS-288, FS-300, and FS-315 have been reported. Two, FS-288 and FS-315, are created by alternative splicing of the primary mRNA transcript. FS-300 (porcine follistatin) is thought to be the product of posttranslational modification via truncation of the C-terminal domain from the primary amino-acid chain.

== Tissue distribution ==
Although FS is ubiquitous, its highest concentration is in the female ovary, followed by the skin.

Follistatin is produced by folliculostellate (FS) cells of the anterior pituitary. FS cells make numerous contacts with the classical endocrine cells of the anterior pituitary including gonadotrophs.

== Function ==
Follistatin is part of the inhibin-activin-follistatin axis.

In tissues, activin plays a significant role in cellular proliferation, while follistatin acts as safeguard against uncontrolled cellular proliferation and an instrument of cellular differentiation. These roles are vital for rebuilding and repairing tissue, and may account for the high prevalence of follistatin in the skin.

In the blood, activin and follistatin are involved in the inflammatory response following tissue injury or pathogenic incursion. The source of follistatin in circulating blood plasma has yet to be determined; however, endothelial cells (lining blood vessels), or macrophages and monocytes (circulating within the blood) have been proposed as likely origins, given its autocrine nature.

Follistatin acts as an inhibitor for bone morphogenic proteins (BMPs) involved in embryo development. Since BMPs facilitate the ectoderm becoming the epidermal ectoderm, their inhibition allows the ectoderm to become the neuroectoderm - eventually forming the neural plate. Other inhibitors involved in this process are noggin and chordin.

Follistatin and BMPs also participate in folliculogenesis within the ovary. The main role of follistatin is for progression of the follicle from early antral to antral/dominant in the oestrus/menstrus ovary. Follistatin is also involved in the promotion of cellular differentiation of estrogen—‌by converting granulosa cells (GC) to progesterone in the dominant follicle—‌and production of large lutein cells (LLC) in the corpus luteum.

== Clinical significance ==
Follistatin is studied for its role in regulation of muscle growth in mice, as an antagonist to myostatin (also known as GDF-8, a TGF superfamily member) which inhibits excessive muscle growth. Lee and McPherron demonstrated that inhibition of GDF-8, either by genetic elimination (knockout mice) or by increasing the amount of follistatin, resulted in increased muscle mass. In 2009, research with macaque monkeys demonstrated that regulating follistatin via gene therapy also resulted in muscle growth and increases in strength.

Increased levels of follistatin, by leading to increased muscle mass of certain core muscular groups, can increase life expectancy in cases of spinal muscular atrophy (SMA) in animal models.

Elevated circulating follistatin levels are also associated with increased risk of type 2 diabetes, early death, heart failure, stroke and chronic kidney disease. It has been demonstrated that follistatin contributes to insulin resistance in type 2 diabetes development and nonalcoholic fatty liver disease (NAFLD). The genetic regulation of follistatin secretion from the liver is via Glucokinase regulatory protein (GCKR) identified by large GWAS studies.. A recent publication highlights the activin-follistatin system as a regulator of kidney development and inflammation, thereby suggesting it as a therapeutic target.

It is also investigated for its involvement in polyendocrine metabolic ovarian syndrome (PMOS), in part to resolve debate as to its direct role in this disease.

Sporadic inclusion body myositis, a variant of inflammatory myopathy, involves muscle weakness. In one clinical trial, rAAV1.CMV.huFS344, 6 × 1011 vg/kg, walk test results significantly improved versus untreated controls, along with decreased fibrosis and improved regeneration.

ACE-083, a follistatin-based fusion protein, was investigated for treatment focal or asymmetric myopathies. Intramuscular ACE-083 increased growth and force production in injected muscle in wild-type mice and mouse models of Charcot-Marie-Tooth disease (CMT) and Duchenne muscular dystrophy, without systemic effects or endocrine disruption.

AAV-mediated FST reduced obesity-induced inflammatory adipokines and cytokines systemically and in synovial fluid. Mice receiving FST therapy were protected from post-traumatic osteoarthritis and bone remodeling from joint injury. In another mouse study, high dose animals showed significant quadriceps growth.

Follistatin has a role in tumors, where it is secreted, creating a microenvironment that neutralizes TGF-β ligands. Therefore, follistatin is being explored as a novel target-able modulator of cell growth, particularly in drug-resistant tumors.

A meta-analysis found levels of increased circulating follistatin in women with polyendocrine metabolic ovarian syndrome (PMOS). This effect was independent of obesity, showing that follistatin may contribute to the pathology of PMOS.
