= Oxyphil cell =

Oxyphil cell may refer to:

- Oxyphil cell (parathyroid)
- Oxyphil cell (pathology)
