= Neuroendocrine cell =

Type of glandular cell found in brain

Neuroendocrine cells are cells that receive neuronal input (through neurotransmitters released by nerve cells or neurosecretory cells) and, as a consequence of this input, release messenger molecules (hormones) into the blood. In this way they bring about an integration between the nervous system and the endocrine system, a process known as neuroendocrine integration. An example of a neuroendocrine cell is a cell of the adrenal medulla (innermost part of the adrenal gland), which releases adrenaline to the blood. The adrenal medullary cells are controlled by the sympathetic division of the autonomic nervous system. These cells are modified postganglionic neurons. Autonomic nerve fibers lead directly to them from the central nervous system. The adrenal medullary hormones are kept in vesicles much in the same way neurotransmitters are kept in neuronal vesicles. Hormonal effects can last up to ten times longer than those of neurotransmitters. Sympathetic nerve fiber impulses stimulate the release of adrenal medullary hormones. In this way the sympathetic division of the autonomic nervous system and the medullary secretions function together.

The major center of neuroendocrine integration in the body is found in the hypothalamus and the pituitary gland. Here hypothalamic neurosecretory cells release factors to the blood. Some of these factors (releasing hormones), released at the hypothalamic median eminence, control the secretion of pituitary hormones, while others (the hormones oxytocin and vasopressin) are released directly into the blood.

APUD cells are considered part of the neuroendocrine system, and share many staining properties with neuroendocrine cells.

== Major neuroendocrine systems ==
- Hypothalamic–pituitary–adrenal axis (HPA axis)
- Hypothalamic–pituitary–thyroid axis (HPT axis)
- Hypothalamic–pituitary–gonadal axis (HPG axis)
- Hypothalamic–neurohypophyseal system

== Pulmonary neuroendocrine cells ==
Pulmonary neuroendocrine cells (PNECs) are specialized airway epithelial cells that occur as solitary cells or as clusters called neuroepithelial bodies (NEBs) in the lung. Pulmonary neuroendocrine cells are also known as bronchial Kulchitsky cells. They are located in the respiratory epithelium of the upper and lower respiratory tract. PNECs and NEBs exist from fetal and neonatal stages in the lung airways.

These cells are bottle- or flask-like in shape, and reach from the basement membrane to the lumen. They can be distinguished by their profile of bioactive amines and peptides, namely serotonin, calcitonin, calcitonin gene-related peptide (CGRP), chromogranin A, gastrin-releasing peptide (GRP), and cholecystokinin.

These cells can be the source of several types of lung cancer, most notably small cell carcinoma of the lung, and bronchial carcinoid tumor.

=== Function ===
PNECs may play a role with chemoreceptors in hypoxia detection. This is best supported by the presence of an oxygen-sensitive potassium channel coupled to an oxygen sensory protein in the rabbit lumenal membrane. They are hypothetically involved in regulating localized epithelial cell growth and regeneration through a paracrine mechanism, whereby their signaling peptides are released into the environment. In addition, they contain neuroactive substances which are released from basal cytoplasm. These substances induce autonomic nerve terminals or vasculature in the deep lamina propria.

=== Role in fetal lung ===
In the fetal lung, they are frequently located at the branching points of airway tubules, and in humans are present by 10 weeks gestation. Peptides and amines released by PNEC are involved in normal fetal lung development including branching morphogenesis. The best-characterized peptides are GRP, the mammalian form of bombesin, and CGRP; these substances exert direct mitogenic effects on epithelial cells and exhibit many properties akin to growth factors.

== Example ==
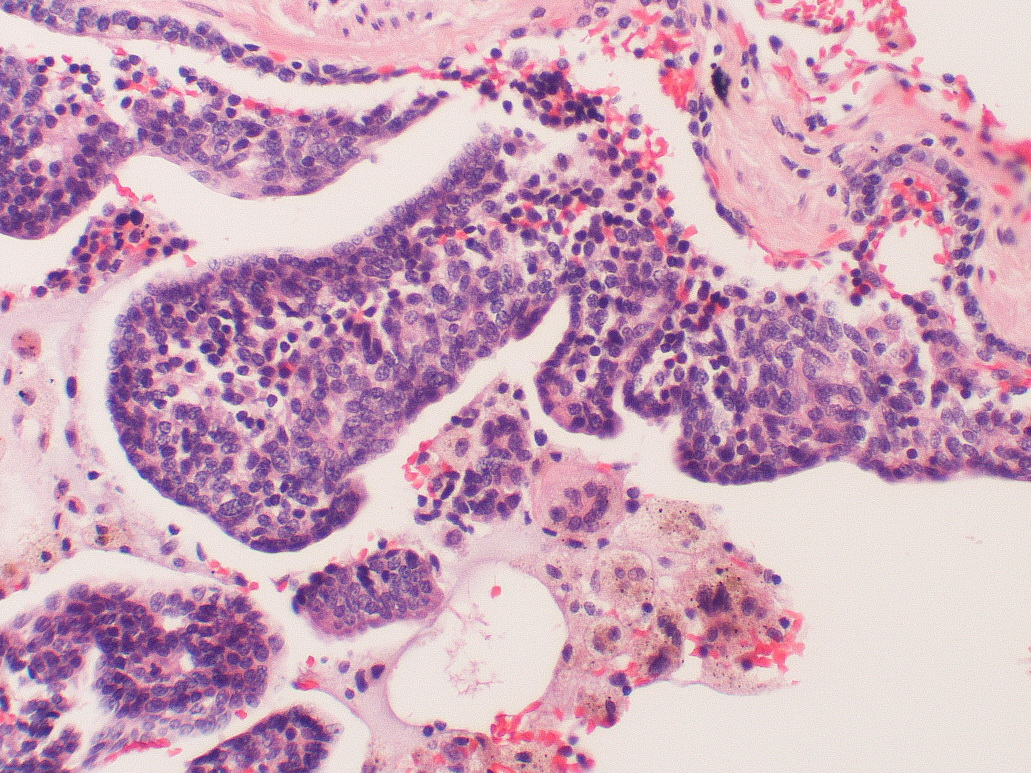
Examples

Specialized groups of neuroendocrine cells can be found at the base of the third ventricle in the brain (in a region called the hypothalamus). This area controls most anterior pituitary cells and thereby regulates functions in the entire body, like responses to stress, cold, sleep, and the reproductive system. The neurons send processes to a region connecting to the pituitary stalk and releasing hormones are delivered into the bloodstream. They are carried by portal vessels to the pituitary cells where they may stimulate, inhibit, or maintain the function of a particular cell type.

== See also ==
- Neuroendocrine tumor
- Neuroendocrinology
- Neurohormone
- Chromophobe cell

- Melanotroph

- Chromophil

- Acidophil cell
- Basophil cell

- Oxyphil cell

- Oxyphil cell (parathyroid)

- Pituitary gland
