= Chromaffin =

Chromaffin (chromium affinty) may refer to:

- Chromaffin cell, a neuroendocrine cell in the adrenal medulla
- Chromaffin granules in chromophil, a cell easily stainable by absorbing chromium salts, used in histology
