= Acidophile (histology) =

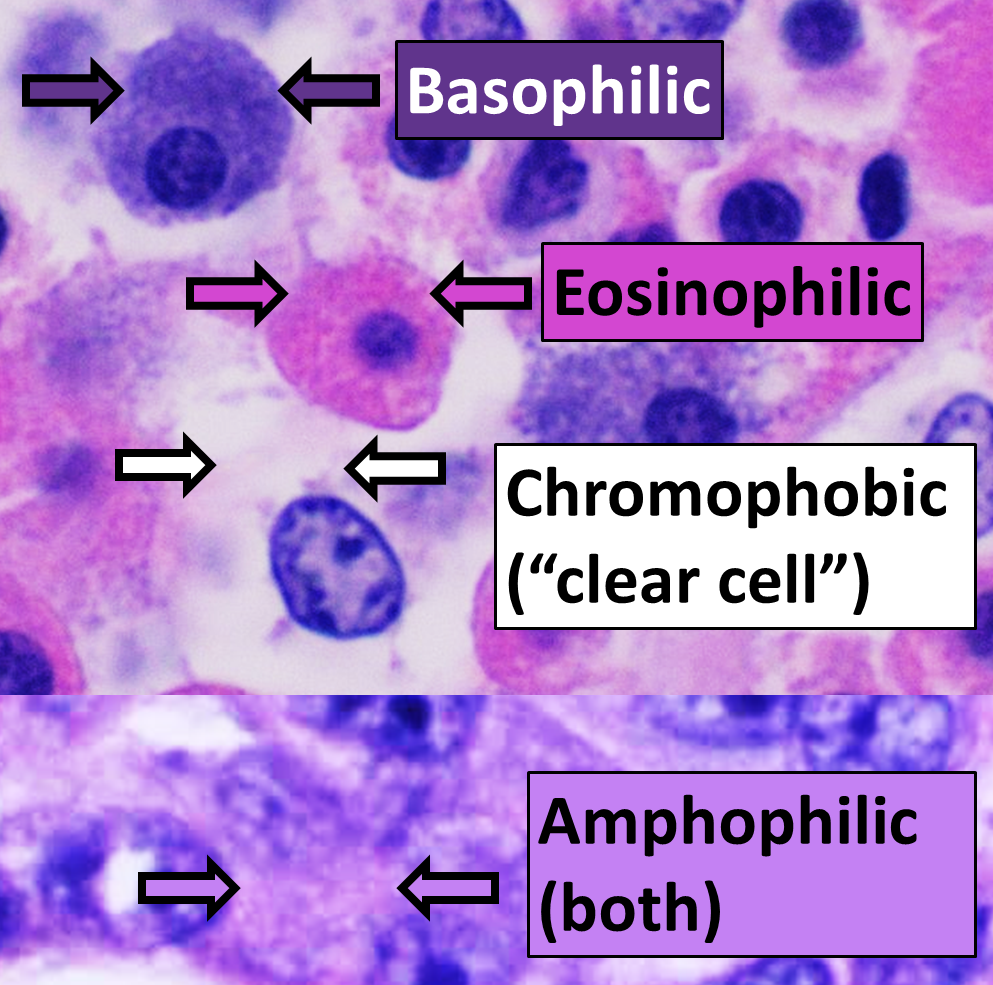
Main staining types when using hematoxylin and eosin (H&E), where acidophile cells stain eosinophilic

Acidophile (or acidophil, or, as an adjectival form, acidophilic) is a term used by histologists to describe a particular staining pattern of cells and tissues when using haematoxylin and eosin stains. Specifically, the name refers to structures which "love" acid, and take it up readily. More specifically, acidophilia can be described by cationic groups of most often proteins in the cell readily reacting with acidic stains.

It describes the microscopic appearance of cells and tissues, as seen through a microscope, after a histological section has been stained with an acidic dye. The most common such dye is eosin, which stains acidophilic substances red and is the source of the related term eosinophilic. Note that a single cell can have both acidophilic substances/organelles and basophilic substances/organelles, albeit some have historically had so much of one stain that the cell itself is called an eosinophil.

== See also ==
- Anterior pituitary acidophil
- Basophilic
- Oxyphil cell
- Eosinophil granulocyte
- Eosinophilic
- Acidophil cell
- Acidophile
