= Melanotroph =

A melanotroph (or melanotrope) is a cell in the pituitary gland that generates melanocyte-stimulating hormone (α‐MSH) from its precursor pro-opiomelanocortin. Chronic stress can induce the secretion of α‐MSH in melanotrophs and lead to their subsequent degeneration.

== See also ==
- Corticotropic cell
- Chromophobe cell
- Chromophil

- Acidophil cell
- Basophil cell

- Oxyphil cell

- Oxyphil cell (parathyroid)

- Pituitary gland
- Neuroendocrine cell
- List of distinct cell types in the adult human body
