= APUD cell =

Type of endocrine cells

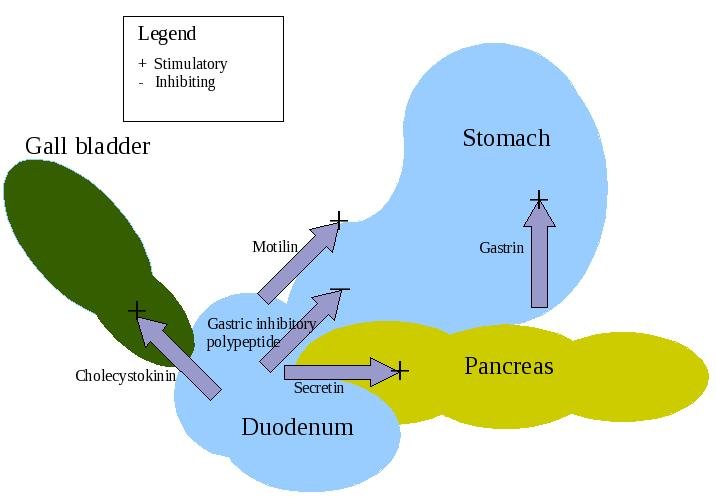
Actions of the major digestive hormones secreted by APUD cells

APUD cells (DNES cells) constitute a group of apparently unrelated endocrine cells, which were named by the scientist A.G.E. Pearse, who developed the APUD concept in the 1960s based on calcitonin-secreting parafollicular C cells of dog thyroid. These cells share the common function of secreting a low molecular weight polypeptide hormone. There are several different types which secrete the hormones secretin, cholecystokinin and several others. The name is derived from an acronym, referring to the following:

- Amine Precursor Uptake – for high uptake of amine precursors including 5-hydroxytryptophan (5-HTP) and dihydroxyphenylalanine (DOPA).
- Decarboxylase – for high content of the enzyme amino acid decarboxylase (for conversion of precursors to amines).

== Cells in APUD system ==
1. Anterior pituitary
2. Neurons of hypothalamus
3. Chief cells of parathyroid
4. Adrenal medullary cells
5. Glomus cells in carotid body
6. Melanocytes of skin
7. Cells of pineal gland
8. Renin producing cells in the kidney

== See also ==
- Apudoma
- Enteroendocrine cell
- Neuroendocrine cell
- List of human cell types derived from the germ layers
