= Oxyphil cell (parathyroid) =

Cell type

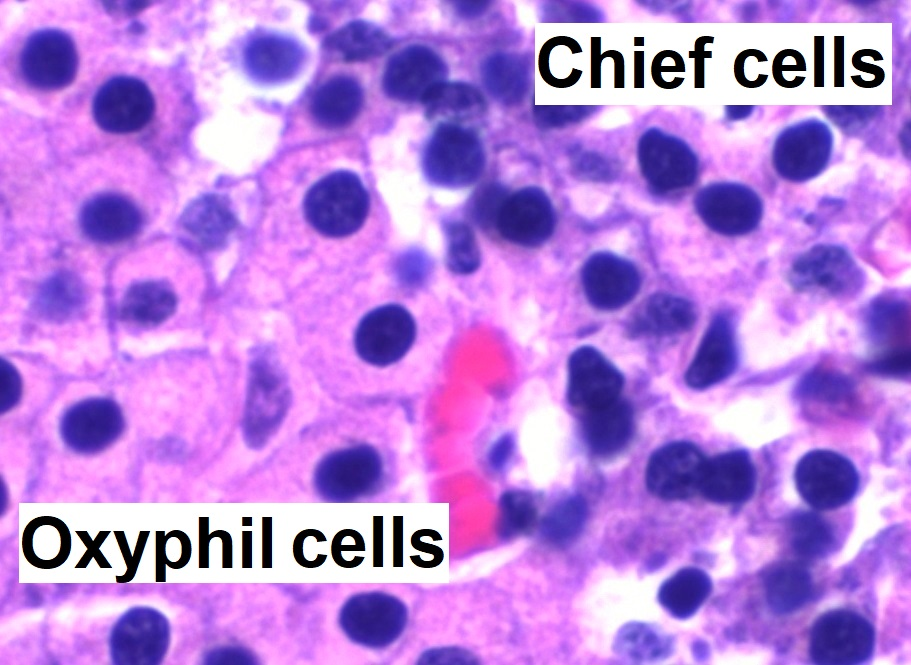
- High magnification micrograph of parathyroid gland, stained using H&E stain. The cells with orange/pink staining cytoplasm are oxyphil cells

Details
- Location: Parathyroid gland

Identifiers
- TH: H3.08.02.5.00005
- FMA: 69084

Parathyroid oxyphil cells, also named oncocytes, are one out of the two types of cells found in the parathyroid secretory organ, the other being parathyroid chief cell. Oxyphil cells are only found in a select few number of species and humans are one of them.

These cells can be found in clusters in the center of the section and at the periphery. Oxyphil cells appear at the onset of pubescence, but have no known function. It is perceived that oxyphil cells may be derived from chief cells at puberty, as they are not present at birth like chief cells. Oxyphil cells increase in number with age. There is evidence that chief cells can transdifferentiate into oxyphil cells.

Although the terms oncocyte, oxyphil cell, and Hürthle cell are used interchangeably, "Hürthle cell" is used only to indicate cells of thyroid follicular origin.

== Structure ==
Oxyphil cells may be binucleated and proteins found within their cytoplasms are basic, resulting in acidophilic cytoplasms. Cytochemically, oxyphil cells and C cells are fairly similar. Oxyphil cells are much larger in size (12–20 μm) compared with chief cells (6–8 μm) and also stain lighter than chief cells. Oxyphil cells have a cytoplasm filled with many, large mitochondria. Oxyphil cells have abundant cytoplasmic glycogen and ribosomes that are interspersed betwixt the mitochondria. The endoplasmic reticulum, Golgi apparatuses, and secretory granules are poorly developed in oxyphil cells of normal parathyroid glands

== Function ==
With nuclear medicine scans, they selectively take up the Technetium-sestamibi complex radiotracer to leave delineation of glandular anatomy.

Oxyphil cells have been shown to express parathyroid gland-relevant genes found in the chief cells and have the potential to produce additional autocrine/paracrine factors, such as parathyroid hormone-related protein (PTHrP) and calcitriol. Oxyphil cells have also been shown to have higher oxidative and hydrolytic enzyme activity than chief cells due to having more mitochondria. Oxyphil cells have significantly more calcium-sensing receptors (CaSRs) than chief cells. More work needs to be done to fully understand the functions of these cells and their secretions.

== See also ==
- List of human cell types derived from the germ layers
- Chromophobe cell

- Melanotroph

- Chromophil

- Acidophil cell
- Basophil cell

- Pituitary gland
- Neuroendocrine cell
