= Folliculostellate cell =

A folliculostellate (FS) cell is a type of non-endocrine cell found in the anterior lobe of the pituitary gland.

== Histology and ultrastructure ==
Rinehart and Farquhar first discovered FS cells through electron microscopy of the anterior pituitary gland. Vila-Porcile named these non-endocrine cells "folliculo-stellate" cells in 1972 due to their stellate (star) shape, and their location lining the lumen of small follicules in the anterior pituitary. Unlike the majority of cells in the anterior pituitary, they are non-endocrine and agranular. They have long cytoplasmic processes which interlock to form a mesh, within which the endocrine cells reside. They typically have a large number of microvilli on their apical side, and contain lysosomes, suggesting phagocytotic activity. Gap junctions can be seen between the FS cells and the adjacent endocrine cells when viewed under an electron microscope.

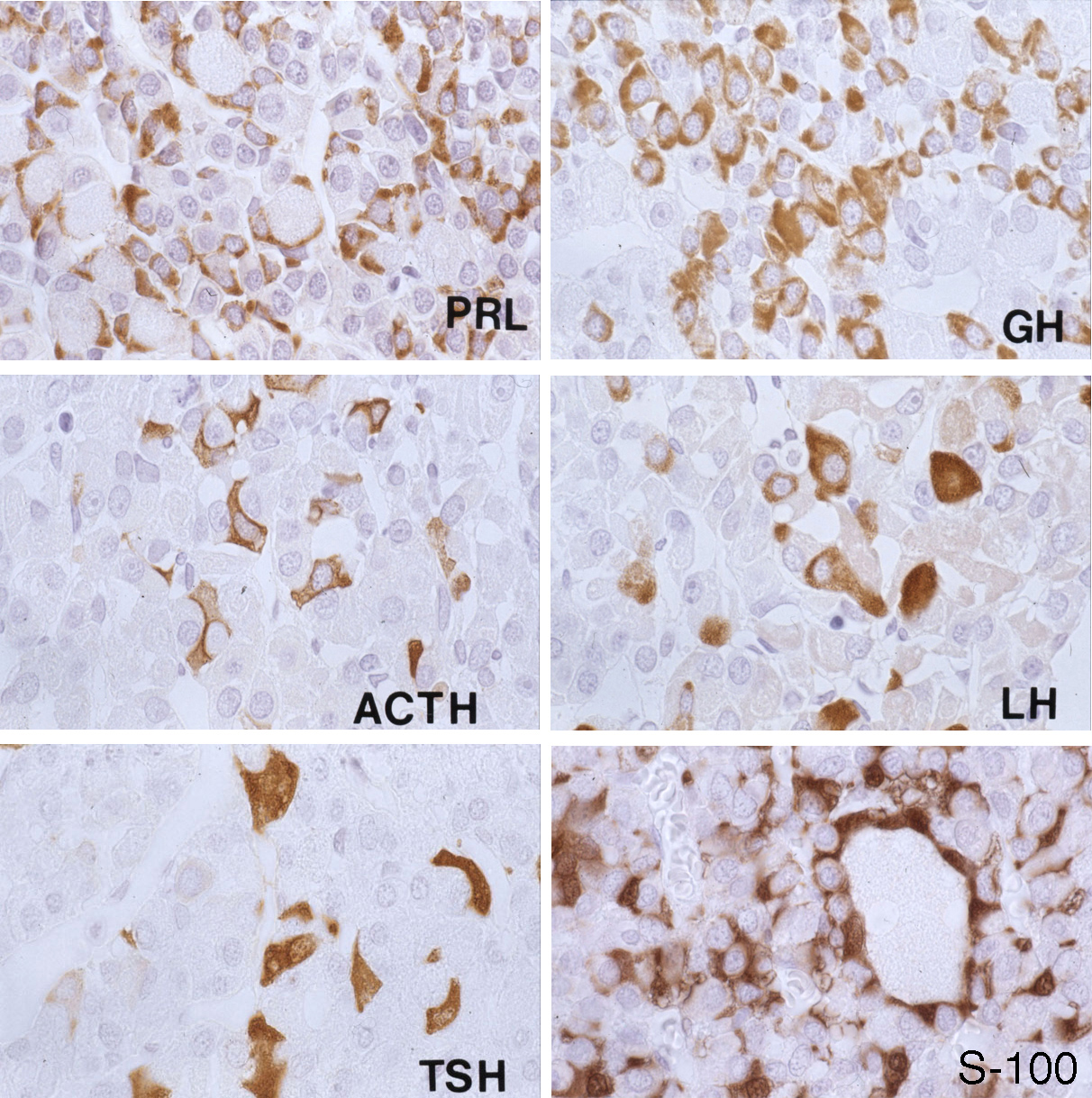
Staining patterns of anterior pituitary hormones and S-100 protein

== Cell properties ==
Using pituitary slices, studies have been conducted that have illustrated that FS cells are arranged into 3D networks which are able to communicate intracellularly through gap junction-mediated calcium wave propagation. Experiments using two main FS cell lines (TtT/GF and Tpit/F1), have hugely improved our knowledge of the functional relevance of these cells- it has been shown that FS cells play a part in three areas of pituitary use: autocrine/paracrine control of anterior pituitary cell function though the use of cytokines and growth factors, intrapituitary communication among various cell types, and modulation of inflammatory response feedback.

FS cells have similar properties to dendritic cells and macrophages, implying a phagocytic role. FS cells having a main role in moderating the neuro-immune/endocrine regulation of inflammation is backed up by data in conjunction with depicting C3a, C5a receptors (which are the main factors of the innate immune system), secreting IL-6 and MIF (inflammatory cytokines), and controlling the release of these cytokines via anti-inflammatory molecules. Experiments have been carried out to assess the protein markers they express, in order to determine their cell-type and thus exact function in the pituitary. The first marker protein discovered in FS cells was S-100b, which is a calcium-binding protein expressed by glial cells. Some populations of FS cells have also been found to express different cell markers, including GFAP (glial fibrillary acidic protein), cytokeratin, vimentin and fibronectin. S-100 protein and GFAP expression seem to be strongest in early, newly formed FS cells, thus could be important in early FS cell development. GFAP expression implies these cells could be of a neuroectodermal origin, whereas keratin-positive FS cells express epithelial-like characteristics. The study of fibronectin expression in these cells suggests that FS cells may help regulate pituitary function, by interacting with hormone secreting cells through fibronectin. Furthermore, as FS cells express vimentin, an intermediate filament protein marker, this supports the theory that FS cells may be derived from glial neuroectodermic cells.

Due to the different array of markers expressed in these cells, it is difficult to specify their exact cell-type and function. Newer findings propose that pituitary FS cells are made up of groups of cells with disparate immunophenotypes and are not a homogeneous population; however, it still isn't clear if these groups of cells are actually different or are simply cells at varying stages in their development. Multiple FS cell lines have been developed to try to observe the location and function of these cells. mRNA levels of FS cells has been investigated via laser capture microdissection and RT-PCR, so progress is being made in terms of understanding the expression and function of these non-endocrine cells of the pituitary. As they have multiple markers, it is plausible that these cells are a hybrid of several different cell types.

== Gap junctions between endocrine cells and FS cells ==
Although FS cells do not secrete hormones, they influence the functionality of hormone-secreting endocrine cells via gap junctions. FS cells form homologous gap junctions with their adjacent counterparts, but also heterologous gap junctions with hormone-secreting endocrine cells. The gap junctions that exist between adjacent FS cells are used to propagate calcium-mediated signals throughout the pituitary to coordinate the function of excitable endocrine cells distributed throughout the gland. The endocrine-FS cell gap junctions, alongside the FS-FS gap junctions form a cell network that allows information about the physiological environment to be transferred around the pituitary to coordinate its secretory function.

Studies in various small mammals have demonstrated that the number of gap junctions is influenced by several factors, such as puberty, the menstrual cycle and lactation. In the mink, the presence of the connexin-43 protein that is functional in gap junctions, correlates to prolactin secretory demand depending on the breeding season. When prolactin secretion is highest in the spring there is the highest abundance of connexin-43 gap junctions; prolactin secretion and gap junctions are lowest in the winter. Thus demonstrating that the FS-cell network has a role in influencing prolactin secretion. This is consistent with studies in rats which found that gap junctions increased during lactation to facilitate prolactin demand. Additional studies in rats found that the number of gap junctions increases with anterior pituitary maturation, and this increase was prevented by castration in male rats which would prevent sexual maturation, and was restored to normal levels by hormone treatment. Similarly, gap junctions increase during pro-oestrus and oestrus phases of the oestrous cycle, and are decreased by fifty percent during di-oestrus. Evidently, the number of gap junctions is influenced by steroid hormone secretion from the gonads, and FS cells contribute to the pituitary-gonadal feedback loop.

== Function as sustentacular cells ==
Folliculostellate (FS) cells are asserted to be of sustentacular (support) function due to their positioning alongside the endocrine (hormone-secreting) cells of the pituitary gland, implying an either mechanical or chemical support – by forming structural support around the endocrine cells or releasing growth factors and cytokines (cell-signalling molecules. Structural support is exemplified in that FS cells are known to produce metalloprotease inhibitor which may protect the basement membrane and maintain three-dimensional structural support; as well as surrounding endocrine cells, forming close contact to provide the growth factors and cytokines, within the pituitary gland.

== Role as signalling mediators for pituitary endocrine cells ==
=== Nitric oxide ===
FS cells are thought to have a role in relaying signals to the hormone secreting endocrine cells of the pituitary gland. Nitric oxide (NO), is reported to be a key modulator of endocrine cell function and has been shown that FS cells (and some endocrine cells) contain neuronal NO synthase, a key NO production enzyme which is responsible for the production of NO from L-arginine. It is thought that FS cells modulate NO production in adjacent endocrine cells via paracrine mechanisms.

=== Interferon-gamma ===
Interferon-gamma is a cytokine that acts to inhibit the release of various hormones from the anterior pituitary, FS cells are thought to be vital in mediating this process. This facilitating role of FS cells was identified when studying the anterior pituitary glands of rats, as anterior pituitary samples with few FS cells failed to exhibit the usual inhibitory effects of interferon-gamma.

=== Glucocorticoids ===
Glucocorticoid induced suppression of the hypothalamic-pituitary-adrenal (HPA) axis has 2 components. Firstly, within 15 minutes of increased glucocorticoid exposure in the anterior pituitary, there is a reduction in the release of preformed adrenocorticotrophic hormone (ACTH). Secondly, glucocorticoids act at a genomic level by suppressing the translation of ACTH and CRH: this process takes 2 hours after exposure to increased glucocorticoids.

The protein Annexin A1 (ANXA1), found in high quantities in the anterior pituitary gland, is located specifically in the folliculostellate cell. In addition to the anterior pituitary gland, it can also be found in the non-endocrine cells of the hypothalamus. Glucocorticoids act on the folliculostellate cells to increase synthesis of ANXA1 and then stimulate its translocation to the cell surface of the FS cell. This translocation is dependent on protein kinase C. ANXA1 subsequently acts on the corticotrophs of the anterior pituitary, which express ANXA1 G protein coupled receptors, via a paracrine mechanism. The downstream signalling pathway which culminates in reduced ACTH synthesis and/or release remains largely unexplored and as consequence remains poorly understood.

The glucocorticoid/folliculostellate cell relationship also has a role in the production of the excitatory neurotransmitter glutamine. Cells in rat anterior pituitary gland which contain large quantities of the enzyme glutamine synthetase also express the S100 protein which is the marker for folliculostellate cells. After exogenous glucocorticoid administration, the number of these cells increases and the activity of glutamine synthetase also increases. This enzyme is necessary as it allows the CNS to produce glutamine internally. This is essential as the quantity of glutamine transported from the peripheral blood to the CNS cannot satisfy the demands of the CNS for glutamine.

=== Interleukin-6 ===
The production of the cytokine interleukin-6 (IL-6) could also be said to be a supportive function, as the IL-6 is a mediator in communication between the endocrine and immune system. IL-6 production by FS cells induces hormone production from endocrine cells, which can then activate the immune system.

== Potential function as stem cells ==
There has been some suggesting evidence through numerous studies that FS cells may act as pituitary stem cells (SC). Indirect evidence from goat as well as rat cells has led to suggestions that the S100β+ cells may act as intermediate cells during the formation of adult pituitary cells. Nonetheless, more research needs to be done to clarify the potential stem cell properties of FS cells.
