= Thyrotroph =

Details
- Location: Anterior pituitary
- Function: Thyroid stimulating hormone secretion

Identifiers
- MeSH: D052684
- TH: H3.08.02.2.00005

Thyrotrophs (thyrotropes or thyrotropic cells) are endocrine cells in the anterior pituitary which produce thyroid-stimulating hormone (thyrotropin), in response to thyrotropin-releasing hormone (TRH) from the hypothalamus. Thyroid-stimulating hormone, triggers the release of thyroxine (T_{4}) and triiodothyronine (T_{3}) from the thyroid gland. Thyrotropes comprise around 5% of the anterior pituitary cells.

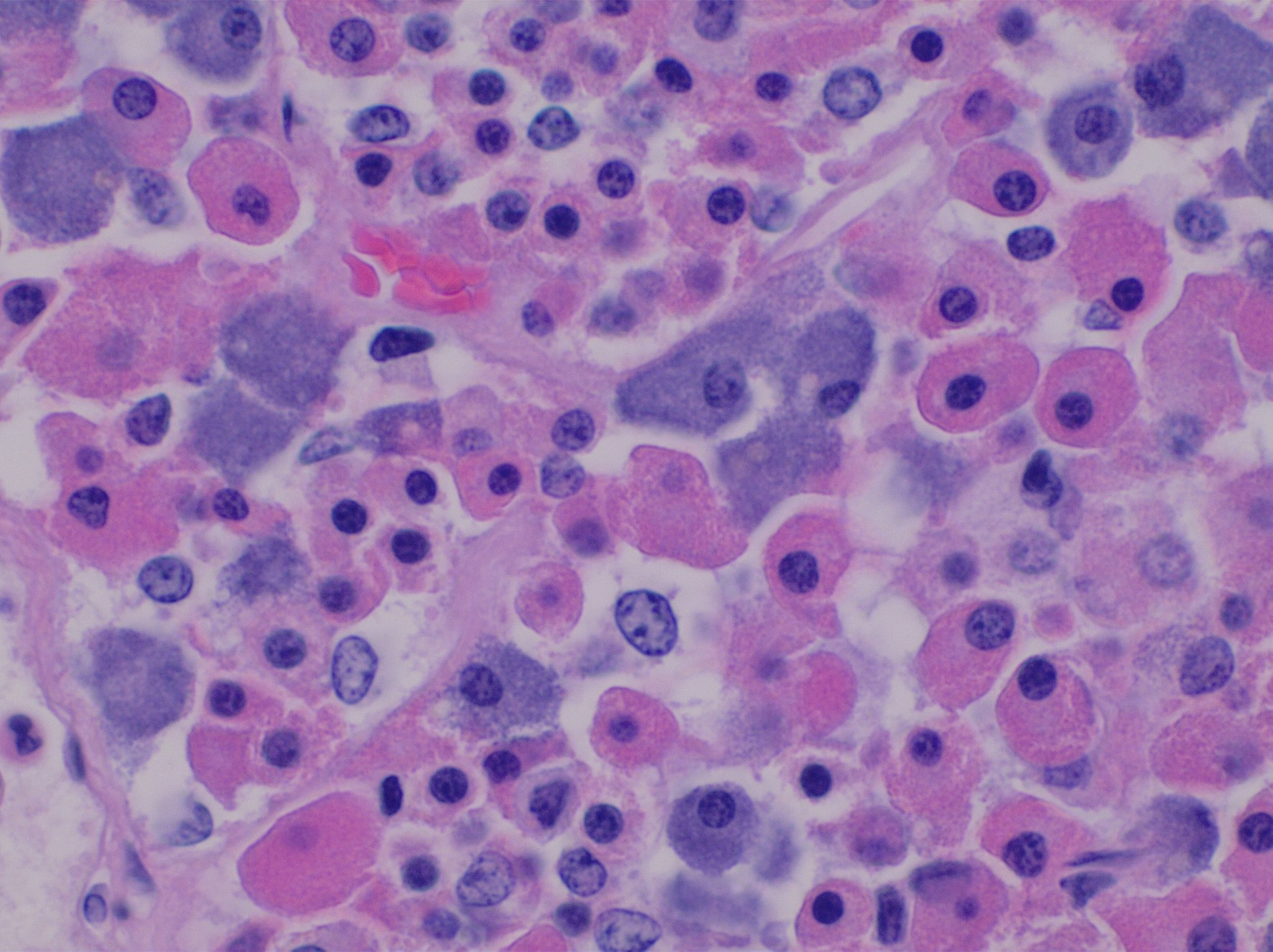
H&E staining of the pituitary gland. Thyrotrophs appear basophilic.

== Imaging ==
Thyrotrophs appear basophilic in histological preparations. In the image displayed on the right, thyrotrophs are the cells with the bluish-purple cytoplasm and the dark purple nucleus. Normal morphology of these cells is characterized by a round shape. However, these cells are best displayed under light microscopy performed following immunohistochemistry with TSH. This specific type of imaging allows for the visualization of the location of thyrotrophs in the anterior pituitary gland. Thyrotropic cells are clustered together in the anteromedial region of the gland.

== Development ==
Thyrotrophs can be identified via immunocytochemistry as early as the 12th week of fetal development, roughly at the same time that gonadotrophs can be detected. The active hormone, TSH, is detected at the 14th week of gestation. Transcription factors, such as Pit-1, GATA-2, and PROP1, influence cell proliferation and maturation.

== Mechanisms of stimulation and secretion ==
=== Effect of TRH signaling ===
The hypothalamus secretes thyrotropin-releasing hormone (TRH) into portal veins, which carry this hormone to the anterior pituitary. Thyrotropin-releasing hormone is a relatively small peptide, containing only three amino acids. TRH stimulates the thyrotropic cells through the use of a phospholipase C second messenger system. TRH binds to a class A G protein-coupled receptor on the surface of a thyrotropic cell, which is known as the thyrotropin-releasing hormone receptor (TRHR). Strong hydrogen bonding interactions stabilize the binding of TRH to TRHR. This binding event induces the coupling of Gα_{q}/G_{11}, which activates phospholipase C. Phospholipase C cleaves PIP_{2} into IP_{3}. Inositol-1,4,5-triphosphate (IP_{3}) binds to calcium channels along the membrane of the endoplasmic reticulum causing a conformational change, which opens the channels and subsequently releases Ca^{2+} ions into the cytosol of the thyrotrophs.

=== Biosynthesis of thyroid-stimulating hormone ===
Thyroid stimulating hormone consists of noncovalently associated subunits: an α-subunit that is conserved in other pituitary hormones and a β-subunit that gives the hormone its specificity. These subunits are synthesized from different genes, and are transcribed in response to the signaling of TRH. The direct pathway from the release of calcium ions to the expression of these genes in thyrotropic cells is unknown. The subunits are glycosylated and remodeled as they move through the cell. Further glycosylation of the subunits occurs as they progress through the secretory pathway. Thyroid stimulating hormone is stored in the secretory granules of thyrotropic cells. Release of these granules is also induced by the signaling of TRH.

=== Release of TSH ===
Multiple neurogenic stimuli are known to affect the release of TSH from thyrotropes. Exposure to cold temperatures increases the secretion of TSH. This increased secretion results from the increased secretion of TRH, as the hypothalamus is excited by the change in body temperature. Furthermore, emotions that activate the sympathetic nervous system—such as excitement and anxiety—decrease the secretion of TSH. The decrease in secretion is also connected to the change in body temperature. Activation of the sympathetic nervous system increases the body temperature, which then causes a decrease in TRH secretion and the subsequent decrease in TSH secretion.

Thyroid hormones can have a direct inhibitory effect on thyrotropic cells, though the exact mechanism is unknown. At elevated levels of thyroxine, the rate of secretion of TSH decreases to near zero, as the body tries to maintain a relatively constant level of thyroid hormone in circulation. However, the inhibitory effect of thyroid hormones may decrease in thyrotropic tumor cells. The receptor affinity for T_{3} significantly decreases for thyrotropic tumor cells in culture when compared to healthy thyrotropes, which reduces the regulatory effect.

In addition, during pregnancy, the size of the pituitary gland increases, and consequently, the expression of TSH also increases. This increase in secretion of TSH likely results from the additional metabolic load that pregnant mothers experience in combination with the secretion of placental hormones.

GLP-1 can also impact the secretion of TSH, though the exact mechanism is unknown. The presence of high affinity binding sites for GLP-1 was recently discovered in the thyrotropic cells of rodents. Understanding this pathway can help the formulation of treatments for type II diabetes mellitus, as there exists a strong association between metabolic diseases and thyroid dysfunction.

== Clinical significance ==
=== Thyrotroph adenomas ===
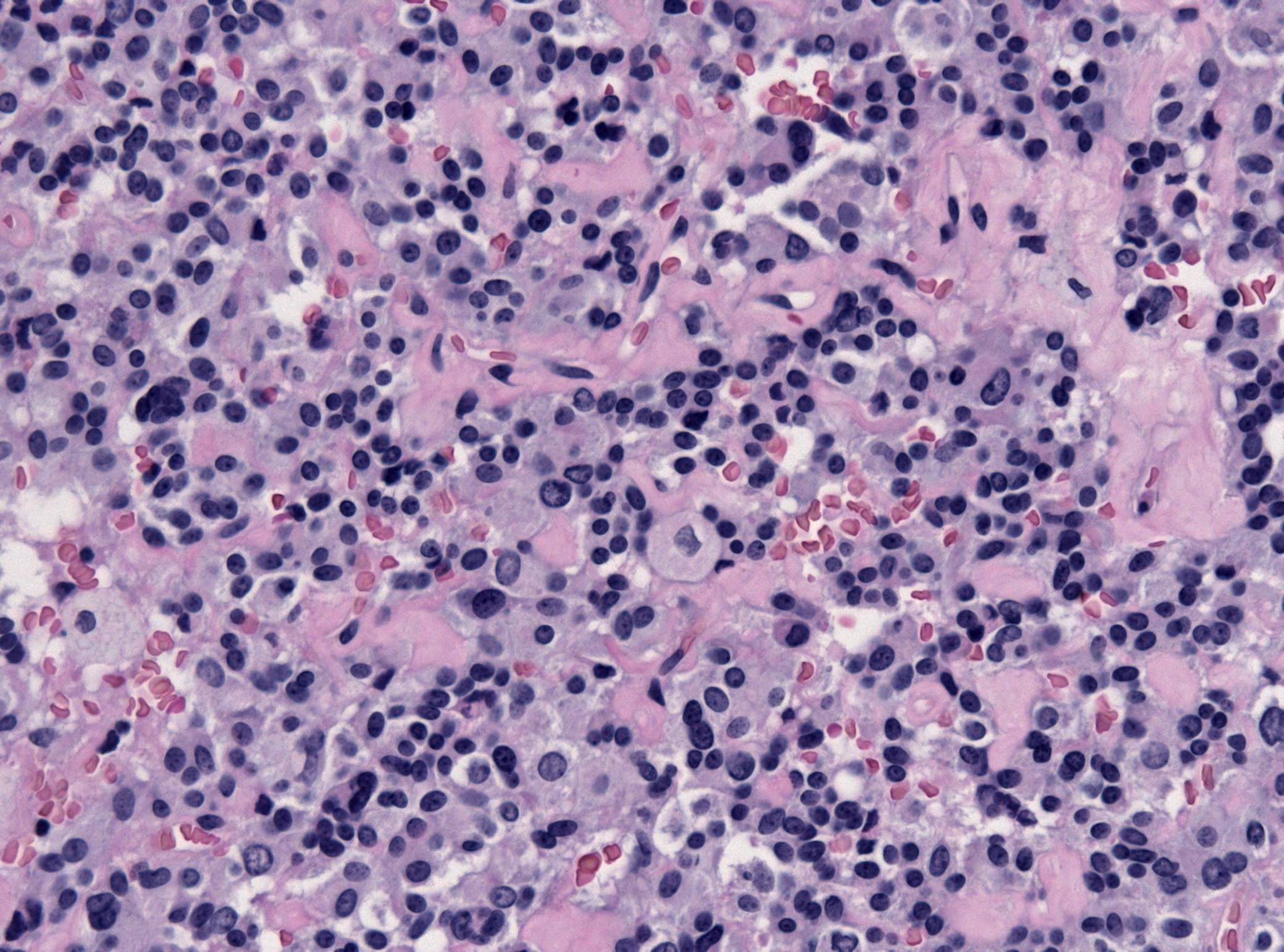
H&E staining of a biopsied thyrotroph adenoma. Basophilic cells (thyrotropes) appear spindle-shaped.

This image shows the histology of a thyrotroph tumor. These thyrotroph tumors are referred to as thyrotroph adenomas, and are very rare. They typically present as functional macroadenomas and generally appear in individuals in their 50s. Thyrotroph adenomas are not well understood as they only comprise roughly 1% of all pituitary tumors. These tumors typically result in increased secretion of TSH. Individuals with thyrotroph adenomas typically have hyperthyroidism and diffuse goitre. Diffuse goitre refers to the elongated enlargement of the thyroid gland that results from the increased expression of TSH.

In histological staining, the thyrotropic cells appear more elongated and spindle shaped and are regularly accompanied by fibrosis.

The World Health Organization (WHO) classifies pituitary tumors based on their transcription factors and hormones, as these factors provide insight into the cell lineage and purpose. Thyrotropic adenomas are identified as having the transcription factors, Pit-1, TEF, and GATA-2, and the hormones, β-TSH and α-subunit. Pit-1, in combination with thyrotroph embryonic factor (TEF), contributes to a cell's differentiation into a thyrotroph and helps stimulate the production of β-TSH. GATA-2 is a transcription factor for cells that belong to the Lhx gene family. The heterodimer formation between the α-subunit and β-TSH is critical to TSH secretion. Disruption of the α-subunit gene results in a lack of TSH secretion, hypertrophy and hyperplasia of thyrotrophs, and decreased quantities of somatotrophs and lactotrophs.

The molecular mechanism behind the formation of these tumors is not well understood, likely due to their low prevalence. Currently, no mutations have been identified in association with thyrotroph adenomas.

In the presence of other pituitary tumors, the thyrotropic cells are unaffected.

=== Other conditions ===
In individuals with primary hyperthyroidism, treatment via thyroid hormone therapy can reverse the hypertrophy and hyperplasia of the thyrotrophs.

Individuals with a rare form of dwarfism characterized by hypothyroidism lack thyrotropic cells altogether, as this syndrome results from a mutation in the Pit-1 gene.

Excess iodine present in individuals with Graves’ Disease can induce thyrotoxicosis, which is the overexpression of thyroid hormone. Sudden overexpression of the thyroid hormone is referred to as thyroid storm. Thyroid storm results in substantial decreases in the amount of thyrotropic cells in the pituitary gland. This decrease, if significant enough, can be fatal. However, with treatment, this decrease in the number of thyrotrophs can be reversed.

== See also ==
- List of human cell types derived from the germ layers
- List of distinct cell types in the adult human body
