= Gonadotroph =

Cell type

Details
- System: Reproductive system
- Location: Anterior pituitary gland
- Function: Gonadotropin secretion (follicle-stimulating hormone (FSH) and luteinizing hormone (LH))

Identifiers
- MeSH: D052681
- TH: H3.08.02.2.00004
- FMA: 83100

Gonadotrophs (also known as gonadotropes, gonadotrophin cells, and pituitary delta cells) are basophilic endocrine cells in the anterior pituitary that produce the gonadotropins, follicle-stimulating hormone (FSH), and luteinizing hormone (LH)). These glycoprotein peptide hormones are released due to the positive input of gonadotropin-releasing hormone (GnRH). FSH and LH are essential in the development and maintenance of reproductive function in mammals. This control of the reproductive system is coordinated by the electrical activity and signaling pathways of gonadotrophs as well as their tight regulation by both sex steroids and paracrine factors.

== Formation and morphology ==
During embryonic development, the anterior and posterior pituitary merge due to regulated cell-to-cell interactions, signaling pathways, and numerous transcription factors. Of the pituitary endocrine cells, the gonadotrophs are the last to form and become functional. It has been found through studies with zebrafish that glycoprotein 𝞪-subunit (gpa) and thyroid-stimulating hormone beta (tshb) expressing cells are precursors for gonadotrophs and thyrotrophs. Even further, the genes involved in the final differentiation of these precursors into gonadotrophs are sine oculus 1 (six1), eyes absent homolog 1 (eya1), steroidogenic factor 1 (sf1), and paired-like homeodomain 1 (pitx1).

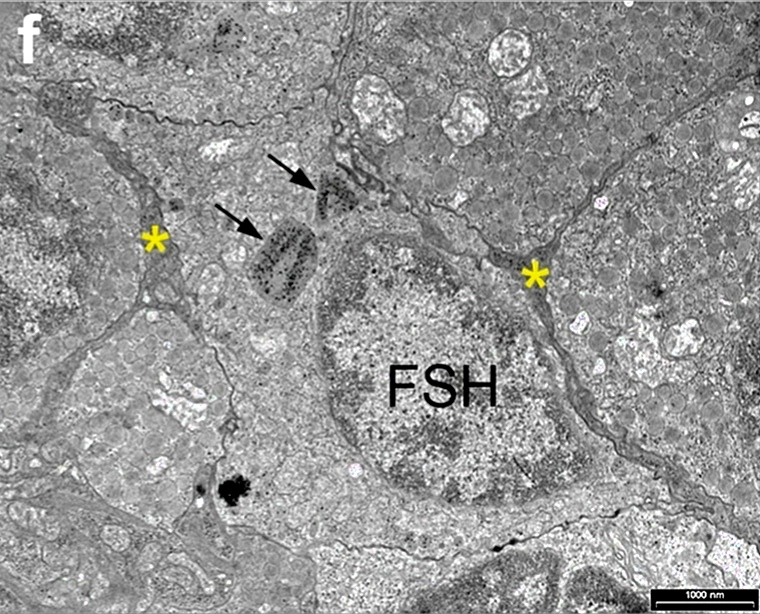
Gonadotroph with FSH granule

Once gonadotrophs are fully developed and functional, these cells compose approximately 15-20% of the anterior pituitary, and gonadotrophs are larger than other cells of the anterior lobe. Gonadotrophs are usually near capillaries and in close proximity to lactotrophs, which suggests a possible paracrine interaction between the two pituitary endocrine cells. In electron micrographs of gonadotrophs, the rough endoplasmic reticulum is prominent and forms dilated stacks, and the Golgi apparatus are also clearly visible. Cytoplasmic granules within gonadotrophs are responsible for producing FSH and LH. In most gonadotrophs, the cytoplasm contains both FSH and LH, but there are some gonadotrophs that contain only one of the two hormones. Therefore, there are two different granule populations in gonadotropes, one type being 150-250 nm in diameter and the other being 350-450 nm in diameter. Gonadotrophs are usually described as globular and basophilic due to the cells' ability to absorb dyes that appear blue or purple under the microscope due to the cytoplasmic granules that have a high affinity for basic stains.

== Electrical activity and signaling pathway ==
Gonadotrophs contain numerous voltage-gated sodium (Na), calcium (Ca), potassium (K), and chloride (Cl) channels in the plasma membrane, and these channels account for spontaneous and receptor-controlled electrical and Ca^{2+} signaling. The presence of these voltage-gated channels makes gonadotrophs electrically excitable cells, meaning the cells are capable of propagating action potentials either spontaneously or by stimulation. The resting membrane potential of gonadotrophs is generally -60 to -50 mV, but when depolarization of the plasma membrane surpasses the threshold voltage, the gonadotrophs fire tall and narrow action potentials with amplitudes of more than 60 mV. This electrical activity of gonadotrophs differs from other pituitary cells because other cell types usually exhibit periodic depolarized potentials with smaller amplitude peaks. In gonadotrophs, the sodium ion channels work simultaneously with calcium ion channels to propagate these action potentials, or calcium channels can be solely responsible for the depolarization of gonadotrophs.

Signaling pathway in gonadotrophs initiated by GnRH binding to GnRHR

One factor that has an important effect on this electrical activity of gonadotrophs is the gonadotropin-releasing hormone (GnRH). GnRH is a hormone released by the hypothalamus, and it is responsible for signaling gonadotrophs to release gonadotropins FSH and LH. GnRH binds to gonadotropin-releasing hormone receptors (GnRHR), which is a G-protein coupled receptor, and signals the oscillation of calcium that hyperpolarizes gonadotropic cell membranes. This oscillation of calcium ions occurs through the resultant signaling cascade of the GnRH binding to the GnRHR in the plasma membrane of the gonadotroph. The G-protein associated with the GnRHR is activated by the binding of GnRH, which results in increased phospholipase C (PLC) activity in the plasma membrane. PLC cleaves phosphatidylinositol-4,5-biophosphate (PIP_{2}) into inositol triphosphate (IP_{3}) and diacylglycerol (DAG) signals. DAG activates protein kinase C (PKC), which phosphorylates proteins, and IP_{3} binds to IP_{3} receptors on the membrane of the endoplasmic reticulum (ER). This binding results in the release of intracellular calcium ions stored within the ER. Therefore, this increase in calcium ions signals the synthesis of secretion of FSH and LH in gonadotrophs. Overall, the fluctuation of calcium levels that is activated by the electrical activity and the signaling pathway within gonadotrophs collectively contribute to the synthesis and release of gonadotropins that will serve an endocrine function in the reproductive system.

== Endocrine function ==
Endocrine system with FSH and LH produced by gonadotrophs in anterior pituitary

The endocrine function of gonadotrophs is derived from the effect of gonadotropins on the reproductive system. The gonadotropins produced by gonadotropjs are FSH and LH, which are dimeric pituitary glycoprotein hormones with a common alpha subunit and distinct beta subunit that confers biological activity of the hormones. These hormones are synthesized in the ER of gonadotrophs and then passed through the Golgi apparatus. After modification and packaging within the Golgi complex, the hormones are delivered to the plasma membrane through constitutive or regulated secretory pathways. The regulated pathway involves the fusion of the secretory vesicles containing FSH and LH to the gonadotroph membrane, and the vesicle is arrested waiting for specific signals, such as increased calcium levels from electrical activity and signaling pathways, that activate secretion of the hormones. The gonadotropins FSH and LH regulate the development of follicles, also known as folliculogenesis, in females, and the development of sperm in males. More specifically, the released FSH acts on ovarian granulosa and testicular Sertoli cells, while LH acts on ovarian theca and testicular Leydig cells. The release of these hormones are directly signaled by the pulsing secretion of GnRH. For example, the low frequency GnRH pulses lead to the release of FSH and the high-frequency of GnRH pulses lead to the release of LH. Therefore, the controlled release of FSH and LH from gonadotrophs allows for precise control of gonadal function.

== Regulation ==
Gonadotroph release of gonadotropins is highly regulated and fluctuates with physiological conditions. For example, in the presence of gonadotropins, ovaries produce and secrete the hormone estradiol. Increased levels of estradiol regulate the surge in LH levels through a negative feedback mechanism during the mid-cycle of the menstrual cycle. This indicates that LH released from gonadotrophs stimulates the production of estradiol; however, when there is a drastic increase in estradiol production, estradiol will regulate LH production by preventing gonadotrophs from releasing more LH until estradiol is needed again.

In males, LH stimulates the production of testosterone by Leydig cells in testis and FSH controls spermatogenesis. Testosterone will also provide negative feedback to gonadotrophs and regulate its own production by acting on the hypothalamus and anterior pituitary. The negative feedback provided by these sex steroids (estradiol and testosterone) lead to the inhibition of hypothalamic secretion of GnRH, which consequently will inhibit the release of LH from gonadotropic cells. FSH is selectively inhibited by paracrine factors, such as inhibin. Inhibin A is secreted from ovarian granulosa cells in females, and inhibin B is secreted by testicular Sertoli cells in males. Similar to the negative feedback of the sex steroids, the inhibin will provide feedback to the pituitary gonadotrophs to reduce secretion of FSH by inhibiting GnRH from activating the release of gonadotropins. The integration of different regulatory signals by gonadotropes results in the coordinated control of production and secretion of gonadotropins to respond and control sexual maturation and reproductive functions.

== See also ==
- List of human cell types derived from the germ layers
- List of distinct cell types in the adult human body
