= Chromophobe cell =

Cell type

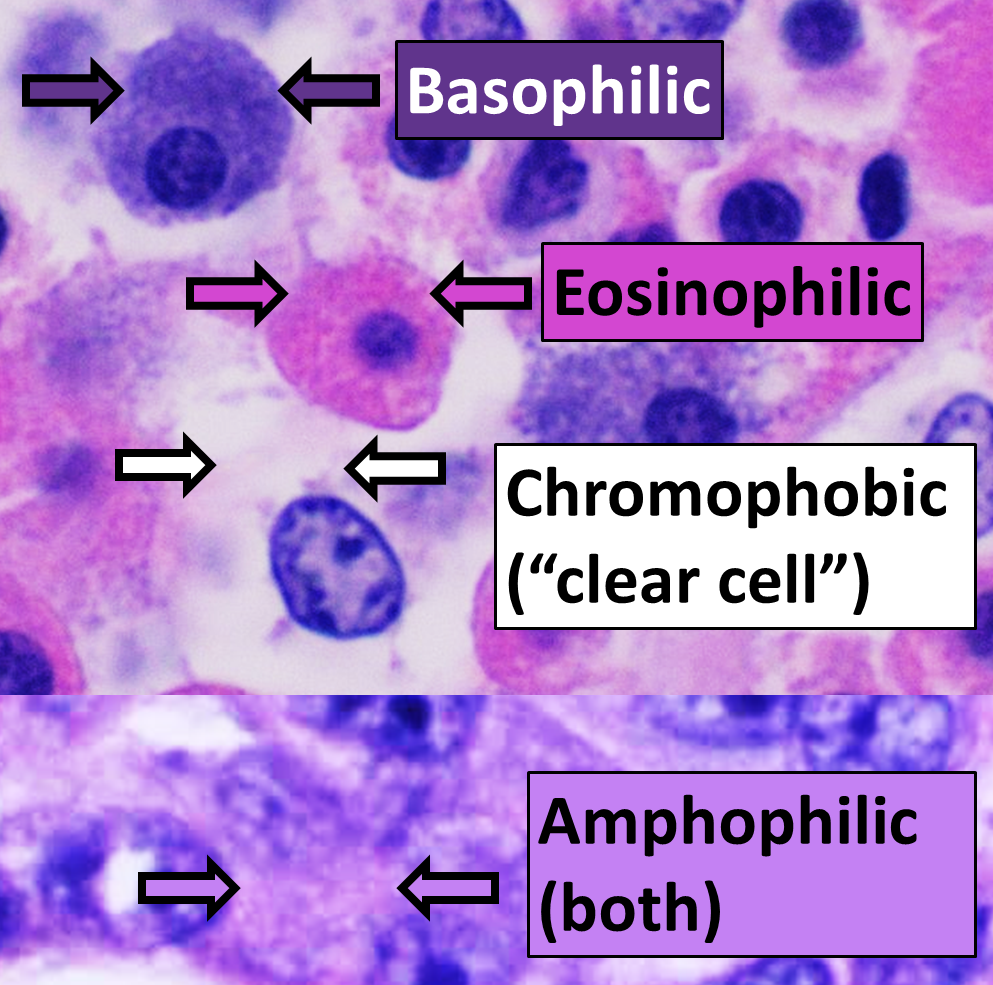
- Main staining types when using hematoxylin and eosin (H&E)

Identifiers
- TH: H3.08.02.2.00018

A chromophobe cell is a cell that does not stain readily, and thus appears relatively pale under the microscope. It is contrasted with a chromophil cell that does stain easily.

Chromophobe cells are one of three cell stain types present in the anterior and intermediate lobes of the pituitary gland, the others being basophilic and acidophilic. One type of chromophobe cell is known as amphophilic. Amphophils are epithelial cells found in the anterior and intermediate lobes of the pituitary. Together, these epithelial cells are responsible for producing the hormones of the anterior pituitary and releasing them into the bloodstream. Melanotrophs (also, Melanotropes) are another type of chromophobe which secrete melanocyte-stimulating hormone (MSH).

== Clinical significance ==
The word "chromophobe" also refers to a type of renal cell carcinoma (distinct from "clear cell"). Chromophobe renal cancer is part of a rare, genetic disorder known as Birt–Hogg–Dubé syndrome. While renal cell carcinoma is one of the most frequently diagnosed cancers, chromophobe renal cancer only accounts for five percent of renal cancer cases. Furthermore, 30% of patients with Birt–Hogg–Dubé syndrome will also develop chromophobe renal cancer. One of the only treatments for this type of cancer is to have surgery to remove any tumors that may be present.

== See also ==
- Renal cell carcinoma (Renal or kidney cancer) and chromophobe renal carcinoma
- Epithelial cell
