= Somatotropic cell =

Growth hormone-producing cell

Details
- Location: Anterior pituitary
- Function: Growth hormone production

Identifiers
- MeSH: D052683
- TH: H3.08.02.2.00021
- FMA: 83095

Somatropic cells (somatotropes) (from the Greek sōmat meaning "body" and tropikós meaning "of or pertaining to a turn or change") are cells in the anterior pituitary that produce growth hormone.

== Structure ==
Somatotropic cells constitute about 30−40% of anterior pituitary cells. They release growth hormone (GH) in response to growth hormone releasing hormone (GHRH, or somatocrinin) or are inhibited by GHIH (somatostatin), both received from the hypothalamus via the hypophyseal portal system vein and the secondary plexus.

== Clinical significance ==
=== Hormone deficiency ===
When levels of somatotropin are low in the body, a physician may prescribe human growth hormone as a drug.

Deficiency in somatotrope secretion before puberty or before the end of new bone tissue growth, can lead to pituitary dwarfism. When growth hormone is deficient, blood sugar is low because insulin is not opposed by normal amount of growth hormone.

=== Hormone excess ===
If there is an excess of growth hormone, it is usually because of over-secretion of somatotrope cells in the anterior pituitary gland. A significant amount of excess somatotrope secretion before puberty or before the end of new bone tissue growth can lead to gigantism, a disease that causes excess growth of body (e.g. being over 7 ft. tall) and unusually long limbs. An excess of secretion of growth hormone after puberty can lead to acromegaly. This is a disease that causes abnormal growth in the hands, head, jaw, and tongue. Some symptoms associated with acromegaly include heavy sweating, oily skin, improper processing of sugars in the diet (diabetes), high blood pressure, increased calcium in urine and swelling of the thyroid gland and arthritis.

== Other animals ==
Bovine somatotropin occurs in the pituitary of cattle and differs in structure from human pituitary growth hormone and is biologically inactive in the human being. Bovine somatotropin aids in regulating the amount of milk produced. Recombinant bovine somatotropin (rBST) is a hormone that is injected in cows that increases milk production.

== See also ==
- Hypothalamic–pituitary–somatic axis
- List of human cell types derived from the germ layers
- List of distinct cell types in the adult human body
