= Oxyphil cell (pathology) =

Cell found in oncocytoma tumors

Oxyphil cells are found in oncocytomas of the kidney, endocrine glands, and salivary glands.
