= Prolactin modulator =

Drug class

- Drug class
- Bromocriptine, a D_{2} receptor agonist, and the most commonly used prolactin inhibitor

Class identifiers
- Synonyms: Indirect prolactin modulator; Prolactin inhibitor; Prolactin releaser
- Use: Hyperprolactinemia; Hypoprolactinemia
- Biological target: D_{2} receptor (mainly)

Legal status

A prolactin modulator is a drug which affects the hypothalamic–pituitary–prolactin axis (HPP axis) by modulating the secretion of the pituitary hormone prolactin from the anterior pituitary gland. Prolactin inhibitors suppress and prolactin releasers induce the secretion of prolactin, respectively.

== Prolactin inhibitors ==
Prolactin inhibitors are mainly used to treat hyperprolactinemia (high prolactin levels). Agonists of the dopamine D_{2} receptor such as bromocriptine and cabergoline are able to strongly suppress pituitary prolactin secretion and thereby decrease circulating prolactin levels, and so are most commonly used as prolactin inhibitors. D_{2} receptor agonists that are described as prolactin inhibitors include the approved medications bromocriptine, cabergoline, lisuride, metergoline, pergolide, quinagolide, and terguride and the never-marketed agent lergotrile. Other dopamine agonists and dopaminergic agents, for instance levodopa (L-DOPA), can also inhibit prolactin secretion. Antiestrogens such as aromatase inhibitors and GnRH analogues are also able to inhibit the secretion of prolactin, though not nearly as robustly as D_{2} receptor agonists, and as such, they are not usually used as prolactin inhibitors.

== Prolactin releasers ==
Whereas D_{2} receptor agonists suppress prolactin secretion, dopamine D_{2} receptor antagonists like domperidone and metoclopramide have the opposite effect, strongly inducing the pituitary secretion of prolactin, and are sometimes used as prolactin releasers, for instance to correct hypoprolactinemia (low prolactin levels) in the treatment of lactation failure. When such drugs are used not for the purpose of inducing prolactin secretion, increased prolactin levels may be unwanted, and can result in various side effects including mammoplasia (breast enlargement), mastodynia (breast pain/tenderness), galactorrhea (inappropriate or excessive milk production/secretion), gynecomastia (breast development in males), hypogonadism (low sex hormone levels), amenorrhea (cessation of menstrual cycles), reversible infertility, and sexual dysfunction. Indirect dopaminergic agents such as levodopa can also suppress prolactin levels. Other prolactin releasers besides D_{2} receptor antagonists include estrogens (e.g., estradiol), progestogens (e.g., progesterone), thyrotropin-releasing hormone and analogues (e.g., protirelin, taltirelin), and vasoactive intestinal peptide. Serotonergic agents such as serotonin precursors (e.g., tryptophan), serotonin reuptake inhibitors, serotonin releasing agents (e.g., fenfluramine, MDMA), monoamine oxidase inhibitors, and serotonin receptor agonists have also been associated with increases in prolactin levels.
