= Lactation suppression =

Act of suppressing lactation

Lactation suppression refers to the act of suppressing lactation by medication or other non pharmaceutical means. The breasts may become painful when engorged with milk if breastfeeding is ceased abruptly, or if never started. This may occur if a woman never initiates breastfeeding, or if she is weaning from breastfeeding abruptly. Historically women who did not plan to breastfeed were given diethylstilbestrol and other medications after birth to suppress lactation. However, its use was discontinued, and there are no medications currently approved for lactation suppression in the US and the UK. Dopamine agonists are routinely prescribed to women following a stillbirth in the UK under the NHS.

== Reasons ==
After birth, some women may desire to stop the production of breast milk, for example when the mother decides to bottle feed from birth, or in the case when the infant dies or is surrendered at birth. Additionally, women who are breastfeeding may need to stop breastfeeding abruptly, for instance if she is taking medication contraindicated for breastfeeding or undergoes surgery. The abrupt weaning process may lead to severe engorgement, extremely painful breasts, and possibly mastitis. Up to one third of women who do not breast-feed and who use a brassiere or binder, ice packs, or analgesics may experience severe breast pain. Specific studies of nonpharmacologic methods of lactation suppression were limited and inconclusive. Available data suggest that many women using currently recommended strategies for treatment of symptoms may nevertheless experience engorgement or pain for most of the first postpartum week.

== Methods ==
=== Medication ===
Dopamine agonists are currently the preferred medication for suppressing lactation, which work by suppressing prolactin production. Cabergoline (Dostinex™) is currently most effective option currently available, as it is available as a single dose (as opposed to bromocriptine which must be taken twice daily for 2 weeks.) It may be prescribed in the case of breast abscess. Although the preferred method of treatment for breast abscess and mastitis is actually to continue breastfeeding, if the decision is made to stop breastfeeding, then chemical lactation suppression is indicated, particularly for severe cases. Carbergoline is not indicated for treatment of discomfort caused by engorgement. In the UK dopamine agonists are routinely prescribed following a stillbirth. Pre-eclampsia is a contraindication for prescribing dopamine agonists.

In the past, hormonal therapies such as diethylstilbestrol were routinely used in the postpartum period, but these are no longer recommended due to side effects such as nausea and vomiting, and severe potential side effects such as thromboembolism, cerebral accident, and myocardial infarction. Estrogen containing birth control pills may have the same side effect, but like diethylstilbestrol is inappropriate for use in the postpartum period due to the risk of side effects.

Pseudoephedrine may also suppress lactation, as it is known to cause low supply.

In the US. Spitz et al. in a 100-year review of all available information concluded that there was nothing new or helpful to assist with the mammary involution or milk suppression process or to treat the pain or discomfort of severely engorged breasts.

=== Other methods ===
By simply not stimulating the breasts after birth, after a few days the production of milk will decease. If breastfeeding has already been established, the production of milk typically takes longer to decrease and may take several weeks. Women may experience pain and discomfort from engorgement. This discomfort is may be relieved by hand-expressing milk or the use of a pump to reduce engorgement and prevent mastitis. The discomfort can also be treated with analgesics. However, as much as one third of all women will experience severe pain in this process.

Historically, binding the breasts by use of tight-fitting bras or ace bandages was used, but this is now discouraged as this may cause blocked milk ducts and mastitis. Fluid restriction is also not recommended as it is likely ineffective and unnecessary.

Cabbage leaves are a common recommendation to reduce discomfort from engorgement. However, a Cochrane review of three studies on this subject concluded that there was no statistically significant evidence that interventions were associated with a more rapid resolution of symptoms; in these studies women tended to have improvements in pain and other symptoms over time whether or not they received active treatment.

According to the Cochrane review other interventions such as hot/cold packs, Gua-Sha (scraping therapy), acupuncture, and proteolytic enzymes may be promising for the treatment of breast engorgement, but there is insufficient evidence to justify widespread implementation.

== See also ==
- Hypothalamic–pituitary–prolactin axis
- Prolactin modulator
