= List of adverse effects of olanzapine =

This is a list of adverse effects of the antipsychotic olanzapine, sorted by frequency of occurrence.

== Very common ==
Very common adverse effects of olanzapine, occurring more than 10%, include:

- Weight gain (dose-dependent). Weight gain of over 7% of a person's initial body weight prior to treatment is in this category of very common too with some estimates of its incidence putting it at around 40.6%. This adverse effect is most likely the result of its potent 5-HT_{2C} receptor and H_{1} receptor blockade (or more specifically inverse agonism).
- Somnolence (dose-dependent). Tends to produce a moderate amount of sedation, less than clozapine and chlorpromazine but more than aripiprazole, amisulpride, paliperidone and sertindole and approximately that of quetiapine and risperidone.
- Hyperprolactinemia elevated blood levels of the hormone, prolactin. Prolactin is one of the hormones that plays a key role in lactation. Long-term uncontrolled hyperprolactinaemia can lead to bone demineralisation (osteoporosis) and an increased risk of fractures (breaks). It tends to produce hyperolactinaemia less often than risperidone, paliperidone and the typical antipsychotics but more often than quetiapine and clozapine.
- Hypertriglyceridaemia (elevated blood triglycerides)
- Hypercholesterolaemia (elevated blood cholesterol levels)
- Hyperglycaemia (elevated blood glucose levels). This may be the result of olanzapine's inhibitory effects on the M_{3} receptor which regulates the release of insulin from the pancreas.
- Brain shrinkage (dose dependent)

== Common ==
Common adverse effects of olanzapine, occurring from 1–10%, include:

- Gynecomastia
- Extrapyramidal symptoms (EPS) (dose-dependent). Tends to produce less extrapyramidal side effects than typical antipsychotics but more extrapyramidal side effects than sertindole, clozapine and quetiapine.
- Mild and transient constipation and xerostomia (dry mouth)
- Dizziness
- Weight gain of over 15% of one's initial body weight. Is reported to occur in approximately 7.1% of patients.
- Glucosuria (glucose in the urine. This is a consequence of hyperglycaemia)
- Accidental injury
- Insomnia
- Orthostatic hypotension (a drop in blood pressure that occurs upon standing up)
- Transient, asymptomatic elevations of hepatic aminotransferases (ALT, AST), especially in early treatment. ALT and AST are liver enzymes which are often tested for as a measure of liver function.
- Dyspepsia (indigestion)
- Erectile dysfunction. This is most likely the result of hyperprolactinaemia.
- Decreased libido. This is most likely the result of hyperprolactinaemia.
- Rash
- Asthenia (weakness)
- Fatigue
- Oedema the accumulation of fluid in the tissues of the body leading to swelling
- Akathisia an inner sense of restlessness that presents itself with the inability to stay still
- Parkinsonism tremor, muscle rigidity, reduced ability to move and being unstable on one's feet
- Dyskinesia abnormal, involuntary, repetitive, and pointless movements
- Vomiting
- Coma
- Cardiac arrest

== Uncommon ==
Uncommon adverse effects of olanzapine, occurring from 0.1–1%, include:

- Leukopaenia a comparatively low white blood cell (the cells that defend the body from foreign invaders) count.
- Neutropaenia a reduced neutrophil (the white blood cells that kill bacteria) count.
- Bradycardia (low heart rate)
- QTc interval prolongation (an abnormality in the electrical cycle of the heart)
- Photosensitivity reaction
- Alopecia (hair loss)
- Urinary incontinence
- Urinary retention, the inability to urinate.
- Amenorrhea the cessation of menses (a woman's menstrual cycles). This is a complication of hyperprolactinaemia.
- Breast enlargement (in either sex). This is a complication of hyperprolactinaemia.
- Galactorrhoea (expulsion of milk from the breasts that's unrelated to pregnancy or lactation. Most likely the result of hyperprolactinaemia)
- High creatine phosphokinase (an abnormal laboratory finding)
- Increased total bilirubin (a by product of the breakdown of haem — a part of blood cells that is used to carry oxygen. In most people this is an indication of impaired liver function)
- Abdominal pain

== Rare ==
Rare adverse effects of olanzapine, occurring from 0.01–0.1%, include:

- Hepatitis
- Rash
- Seizures

== Very rare ==
Very rare adverse effects of olanzapine (that are necessarily causally related), occurring less than 0.01%, include:

- Agranulocytosis, a potentially fatal drop in white blood cell count, basically an exaggerated form of leukopaenia.
- Thrombocytopaenia. A drop in blood platelet counts which are involved in blood clotting.
- Thromboembolism (blood clots; including pulmonary embolism and deep vein thrombosis)
- Rhabdomyolysis (breakdown of muscle tissue leading to the release of myoglobin into the bloodstream which in turn damages the kidneys)
- Alkaline phosphatase increased (an abnormal laboratory parameter)
- Priapism (a painful and enduring erection)
- Urinary hesitation
- Pancreatitis, swelling of the pancreas which supplies the body with insulin.
- Neuroleptic malignant syndrome a potentially fatal complication of antipsychotic drug treatment. Presents with hyperthermia, tremor, tachycardia (high heart rate), mental status change (e.g. confusion), etc.
- Jaundice, which is basically when the body's ability to clear a by product (called bilirubin) of the breakdown of an essential component of the blood called haem, is impaired leading to yellow discolouration of the skin, eyes and mucous membranes.
- Diabetic coma
- Diabetic ketoacidosis. Type II diabetes mellitus is basically where the body cannot effectively utilise sugars to produce energy due to the fact that its cells have become unresponsive to the hormone, insulin, which allows cells to utilise sugars for energy. This in turn forces the body to burn fats for energy and fats require conversion to ketone bodies in order to be utilised by the cells of the body as an energy source. The ketone bodies are acidic hence when the body is entirely reliant on these ketone bodies for energy the levels in the blood reaches a point where it overwhelms the body's natural mechanisms to keep blood pH (a measure of acidity) within a safe range, leading to the blood becoming acidic which is potentially damaging to the tissues of the body due to the ability of acidic environments to denature the proteins of the body.
- Anaphylactic reaction a potentially life-threatening allergic reaction
- Sudden cardiac death
