= List of adverse effects of chlorpromazine =

Chlorpromazine includes the following list of adverse effects (serious adverse effects appear in bold): (Note: Data on the exact incidence of the different adverse effects is greatly lacking so only rough approximations of adverse effect incidence is available)

== Very common ==
- Sedation (cf. "Thorazine shuffle" – a shuffling gait due to sedation)
- Somnolence
- Extrapyramidal symptoms (Note: Refer to main text below for details on this adverse effect)
- Weight gain
- Orthostatic hypotension (Note: A drop in blood pressure that results from standing up)
- Dry mouth
- Constipation

== Common ==
- ECG changes (Note: A disturbance in the electrical cycle of the heart)
- Contact dermatitis
- Sensitivity to light
- Urticaria (hives)
- Maculopapular rash
- Petechia or edema
- Hyperprolactinaemia (Note: Elevated serum levels of the lactation-related hormone prolactin. This in turn can result, in the short term, at least, in galactorrhoea (lactation that is unrelated to pregnancy or breastfeeding), gynaecomastia (swollen breast tissue), sexual dysfunction and amenorrhoea (the absence of the menstrual period in women). Whereas in the long-term hyperprolactinaemia can result in osteoporosis (brittle bones).)
- Impaired thermoregulation (Note: An impaired ability to regulate one's body temperature)
- **Hyperglycaemia** (Note: High blood glucose (sugar) levels)
- Other hypothalamic abnormalities (Note: The hypothalamus of the brain regulates the release of a number of hormones as well as a few "housekeeping" functions such as tight control over body temperature)
- Blurred vision
- Confusion
- Raised ANA titre
- Positive SLE cells
- Mydriasis (Note: Widening (dilation) of the pupils)
- Atonic colon
- **Seizure** (Note: Refer to the text below for details)
- Agitation (restlessness)
- Stably and for life, alters natural processes in the biological systems of the mitochondria of the nervous system.
- Inhibits the efficiency of the electron transport chain.
- Pain at the injection site
- Injection site abscess

== Uncommon ==
- Miosis (Note: Constriction of the pupils of the eyes)
- **Urinary retention** (Note: Being unable to pass urine)
- Nasal congestion
- Nausea
- Obstipation
- Arrhythmias
- Skin pigmentation
- Glycosuria (Note: Glucose (sugar) in the urine due to there being too much glucose in the blood for the kidneys to reabsorb it all when filtrate goes through loop of henle in the nephrons of the kidney.)
- **Hypoglycaemia** (Note: Low blood glucose (sugar))
- **Paralytic ileus**

== Rare ==
- **Agranulocytosis** (Note: Basically an exaggerated form of leucopaenia. It occurs when the white blood cell (WBC) count drops below 5% of the norm)
- **Haemolytic anaemia** (Note: Where the number of red blood cells of the body die breakdown to an abnormal extent. These cells carry oxygen across the body from the lungs)
- **Aplastic anaemia** (Note: Where the bone marrow stops adequately (in order to replenish the blood cells that die off every day) producing new blood cells)
- **A-V block** (Note: An abnormality in the electrical activity of the heart which can lead to potentially fatal changes in heart rhythm)
- **Hypertensive crises** (Note: Dangerously (in the short-term) high blood pressure)
- Thrombocytopenic purpura
- Exfoliative dermatitis
- **Toxic epidermal necrolysis** (Note: A dangerous skin reaction)
- **Systemic lupus erythematosus** (Note: An autoimmune reaction)
- **Syndrome of inappropriate secretion of antidiuretic hormone** (SIADH) (Note: A potentially fatal collection of symptoms (i.e. syndrome) that results from an abnormally excessive release of antidiuretic hormone (ADH). This in turn increases the reabsorption of)
- Water retention
- **Cholestatic jaundice**
- **Liver injury**
- **Neuroleptic malignant syndrome** (Note: A potentially fatal condition that is caused by dopamine receptor-blocking agents such as antipsychotics. It develops over a period of days or weeks and is characterised by rigidity, tremor, diarrhoea, tachycardia, altered mental status (e.g. confusion, mania, hallucinations, etc.) and hyperthermia (high body temperature))
- **Myasthenia gravis** (Note: An autoimmune condition in of which the body's defences attack the neuromuscular junction – the gap between muscle and nerve cells across which the nerves send messages to the muscle cells)

== Unknown frequency ==
- **Leucopaenia** (Note: An abnormally low number of white blood cells in the blood. These cells defend the body from infections and hence this can heighten one's risk of infections)
- Eosinophilia (Note: An abnormally high number of eosinophils – the cells of the immune system that defends the body from parasites)
- **Pancytopaenia** (Note: An abnormally low number of all three major groups of blood cells including the red blood cells, white blood cells and platelets)
- **Priapism** (Note: A painful and sustained (usually a few hours) erection)
- Photophobia (Note: Fear of light)
- Corneal deposits
- **Respiratory depression** (Note: A reduction in the normal homeostatic breathing reaction to reductions in plasmacarbon dioxide levels)
- **Ventricular tachycardia**
- **QT interval prolongation**
- **Atrial fibrilation**
- **Hyperthermia** (Note: High body temperature)
- **Hypothermia** (Note: Low body temperature)
- Galactorrhoea (Note: Lactation that is unassociated with lactation or breastfeeding)
- Breast enlargement in either sex
- False-positive pregnancy tests
- Allergic reaction
- Fits
- **Cerebral oedema** (Note: The accumulation of fluid in the tissues of the brain)
- Urinary incontinence
- **Coagulation defects**
- Nightmares
- Abnormality of cerebrospinal fluid proteins
- **Dysphoria** (Note: Basically the opposite to euphoria)
- Catatonic excitement
- **Narrow angle glaucoma**
- **Optic atrophy**
- **Pigmentary retinopathy**
- Amenorrhoea (Note: The absence of menstrual periods)
- Infertility
- **Tardive dyskinesia** (Note: An often irreversible and sometimes even fatal movement disorder characterised by involuntary, repetitive and purposeless movements of the face, extremities, lips or tongue. Usually takes a number of years to develop but in some it can appear within months or less since the initiation of antipsychotic treatment)
