= List of adverse effects of risperidone =

This is a list of adverse effects of risperidone. Risperidone, sold under the brand name Risperdal among others, is an antipsychotic. It is used to treat schizophrenia, bipolar disorder, and irritability associated with autism.

== Common adverse effects ==
Common adverse effects of risperidone, occurring greater than or equal to 1%, include:

- Rash (oral, adults, 1% to 4%; pediatrics, up to 11%; IM, less than 4%)
- Hyperprolactinaemia (risperidone is probably the most notorious antipsychotic for causing hyperprolactinaemia via its potent blockade of D2 receptors expressed on the lactotrophic cells of the pituitary) (oral, adults, less than 1%; pediatrics, 49% to 87%; IM, less than 4%)
- Weight gain (causes less weight gain than clozapine, olanzapine and zotepine, around as much weight gain as quetiapine and more weight gain than amisulpride, aripiprazole, lurasidone, asenapine and ziprasidone) (oral, adult, 8.7% to 20.9%; pediatric, 14% to 32.6%; IM, adult, 8% to 10%)
- Seborrhea
- Constipation (oral, 8% to 21%; IM, 5% to 7%)
- Diarrhoea (oral, 1% to 8%; IM, less than 4%)
- Excessive Salivation (oral, 1% to 10%; IM, 1% to 4%)
- Increased appetite (oral, adult, more than 5%; pediatric, 4% to 47%; IM, 4%)
- Indigestion (oral, 2% to 10%; IM, 6%)
- Nausea (oral, 4% to 16%; IM, 3% to 4%)
- Vomiting (oral, 10% to 25%; IM, less than 4%)
- Upper abdominal pain (oral, adult, more than 5%; pediatric, 13% to 16%)
- Xerostomia (oral, 4% to 15%; IM, up to 7%)
- Akathisia (oral, up to 10%; IM, 4% to 11%)
- Dizziness (oral, 4% to 16%; IM, 3% to 11%)
- Dyspnoea
- Asthenia
- Agitation
- Urinary incontinence
- Arthralgia
- Myalgia
- Epistaxis
- Somnolence (oral, adult, 3% to 6%; pediatric, 8% to 29% )
- Sleep disturbances
- Major depression, self harm and suicidal thoughts
- Dose-dependent extrapyramidal side effects such as dystonia (oral, adult, 3% to 5%; pediatric, 2% to 6%; IM, adult, less than 4%), tremor (oral, 2% to 12%; IM, 3% to 24%) and Parkinsonism (oral, 6% to 28%; IM, 8% to 15%)
- Blurred vision (oral, 1% to 7%; IM, 2% to 3%)
- Anxiety (oral, up to 16% IM, less than 4%)
- Cough (oral, adults, 2%; pediatrics, 24%; IM, 2% to 4%)
- Nasal congestion (oral, adult, 4% to 6%; pediatric, 13%)
- Nasopharyngitis (oral, adult, 3% to 4%; pediatric, 21%)
- Pain in the throat (oral, adult, more than 5%; pediatric, 3% to 10%)
- Upper respiratory tract infection (oral, 2% to 8%; IM, 2% and 6%)
- Fatigue (oral, adult, 1% to 3%; pediatric, 18% to 42%; IM, 3% to 9%)
- Generalised pains (IM, 1% to 4%)
- Gynecomastia
- Galactorrhea
- Retrograde ejaculation

Note: The percentage provided next to the adverse effect is the incidence of that adverse effect according to DrugPoint.

== Rare adverse effects (but not necessarily causally related) ==
Rare adverse effects of risperidone, occurring less than 1%, include:

- Prolonged QT interval
- Sudden cardiac death
- Syncope (oral, up to 1%; IM, up to 2%)
- Diabetic ketoacidosis
- Hypothermia
- Pancreatitis
- Agranulocytosis
- Neutropenia
- Leukopenia
- Thrombocytopenia
- Thrombotic thrombocytopenic purpura
- Stroke (oral, less than 5%; IM, less than 4%)
- Seizure (oral, 0.3%; IM, 0.3%)
- Tardive dyskinesia (oral, less than 5%; IM, less than 4%)
- Priapism
- Pulmonary embolism
- Neuroleptic malignant syndrome (oral, adults, less than 1%; pediatrics, less than 5%)
- Anorexia
- Hypoaesthesia
- Impaired concentration
- Sexual dysfunction
- Angioedema
- Intestinal obstruction
- Megacolon
- Oedema
- Hyponatraemia

Note: The percentage provided next to the adverse effect is the incidence of that adverse effect according to DrugPoint.
