= Hypothalamic–pituitary hormone =

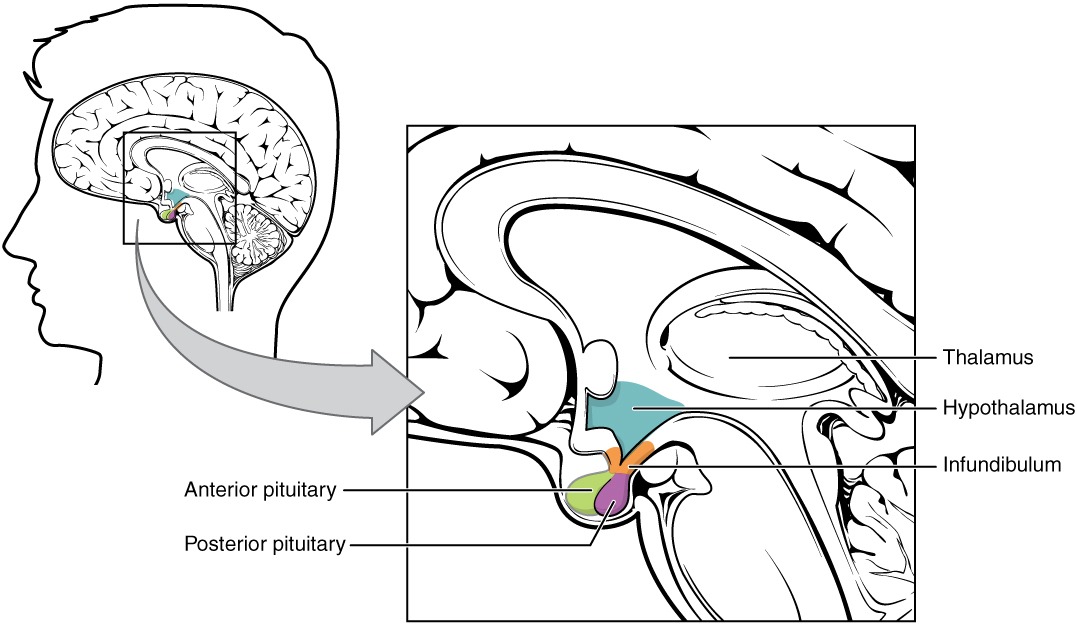
The Hypothalamus–Pituitary Complex

Hypothalamic–pituitary hormones are hormones that are produced by the hypothalamus and pituitary gland. Although these organs are relatively small, the hormones have effects throughout the body. They can be classified as a hypothalamic–pituitary axis (HP axis), of which the adrenal (HPA), gonadal (HPG), thyroid (HPT), somatotropic (HPS), and prolactin (HPP) axes are branches.

Hormones of the hypothalamic–pituitary–end organ axis
	HPT axis	HPA axis	HPG axis	HPS axis	HPP axis
Hypothalamic hormone	TRH	CRH	GnRH	GHRH	Dopamine (inhibitor)
Pituitary cells	Thyrotrope	Corticotrope	Gonadotrope	Somatotrope	Lactotrope
Pituitary hormone	TSH	ACTH	LH and FSH	GH	Prolactin
End organ	Thyroid	Adrenal	Gonads (testes or ovaries)	Liver	Mammary gland
Product	Thyroxine	Cortisol	Testosterone, estradiol	IGF-1	Milk (no feedback)

The function of these hormones may be altered by physical activity.

== Details ==
ADH (vasopressin) and oxytocin are stored and released by the posterior pituitary.

The anterior pituitary is an amalgam of hormone-producing glandular cells. Unlike the posterior, the neurosecretory cells in the anterior pituitary synthesize their own hormones, which are transported through the pituitary portal system. These hormones are prolactin, growth hormone, TSH, adrenocorticotropic hormone, FSH and LH. Some have targets in glands and some have direct function.

Conditions related to the limbic system regulate hormone release. The thalamus may also, with pain. Many of these stimuli come from the senses. Temperature control can be found in the hypothalamus. These hormones also regulate water balance and hunger, and are associated with water balance control (ADH). Other examples:

- Corticotropic releasing hormone (CRH): stimulates ACTH secretion
- Thyrotropin releasing hormone (TRH): stimulates TSH and prolactin secretion
- Growth hormone releasing hormone (GHRH): stimulates GH secretion
- Somatostatin: inhibits GH (and other hormone) secretion
- Gonadotropin releasing hormone (GnRH): stimulates FSH and LH secretion
- Prolactin releasing hormone (PRH): stimulates PRL secretion
- Prolactin inhibiting hormone (dopamine): inhibits PRL secretion

These hypothalamic hormones are secreted in pulses. They act on specific membrane receptors. They are also glycoproteins. They stimulate:

- release of pituitary hormones
- synthesis of pituitary hormones
- release of stored pituitary hormones
- hyperplasia
- hypertrophy

The anterior pituitary produces prolactin, GH, TSH, ACTH, FSH, and LH. Fifteen to 20 percent of corticotroph cells produce ACTH. The targets are the adrenal glands, adipocytes and melanocytes. Three to five percent of thyrotroph cells produce TSH. Ten to 15 percent are gonadotrophic and produce LH and FSH. Forty to 50 percent are somatotrophic and produce GH, in childhood in particular. Ten to 15 percent are lactotrophic and produce prolactin.
