= Prolactinoma =

Pituitary gland tumor which secretes the hormone prolactin

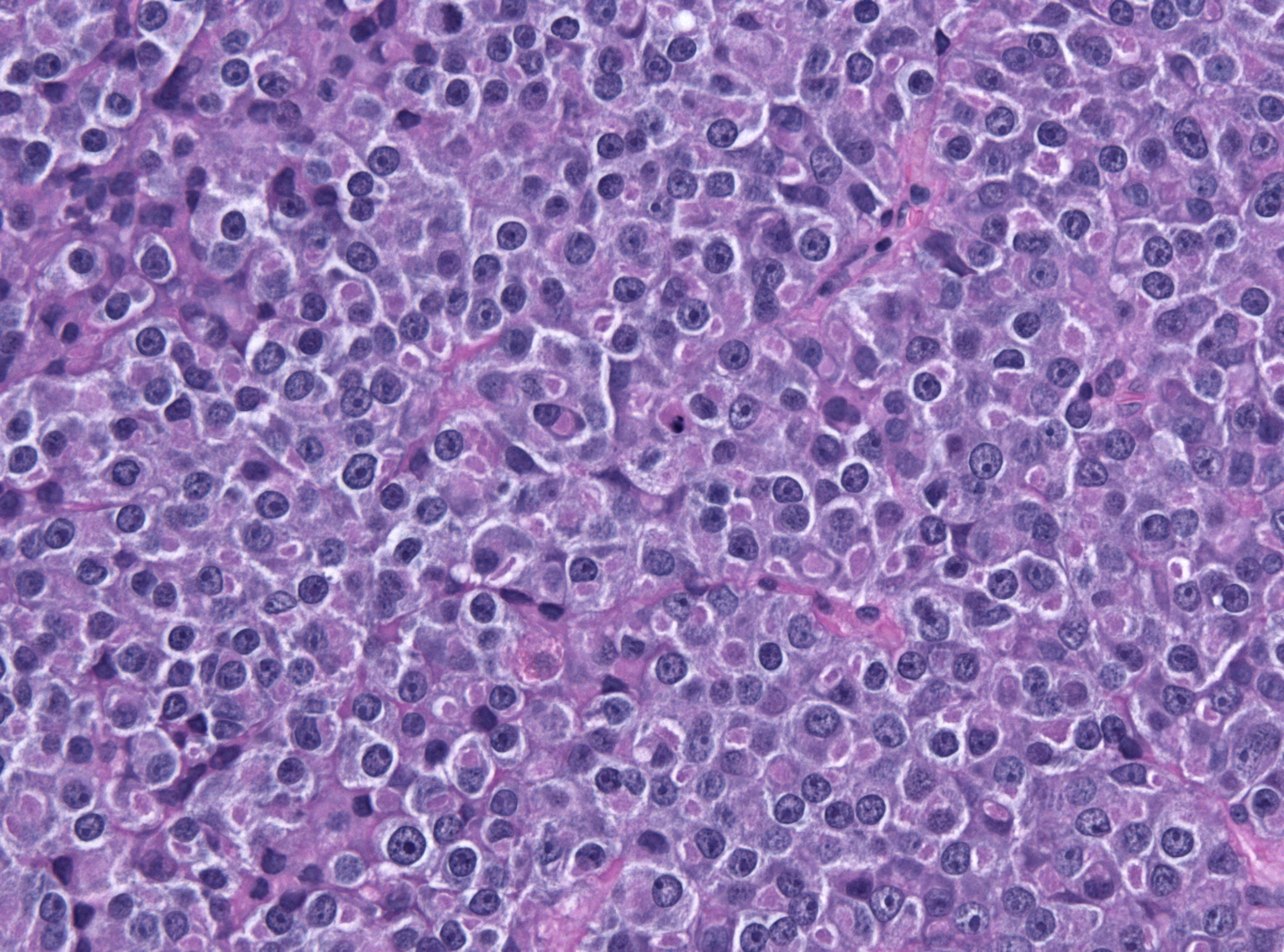
- Specialty: Oncology, endocrinology, neurology, neurosurgery
- Frequency: 0.035%

A prolactinoma is a tumor (adenoma) of the pituitary gland that produces the hormone prolactin. It is the most common type of functioning pituitary tumor. Symptoms of prolactinoma are due to abnormally high levels of prolactin in the blood (hyperprolactinemia), or due to pressure of the tumor on surrounding brain tissue and/or the optic nerves. Based on its size, a prolactinoma may be classified as a microprolactinoma (<10mm diameter) or a macroprolactinoma (>10mm diameter).

== Signs and symptoms ==
The most common symptoms at the time of diagnosis often differ between males and females. Females tend to experience more symptoms related directly to abnormally high prolactin levels, such as inappropriate lactation (occurring outside of nursing or recent childbirth) or an absence of menstruation. By contrast, males are more likely to initially present with symptoms of the tumor compressing their brain tissue, such as headaches and vision changes, as well as exhibit fertility issues and hormonal disruptions such as a loss of libido.

The symptoms due to a prolactinoma are broadly divided into those that are caused by increased prolactin levels and those caused directly by the mass itself. Those that are caused by increased prolactin levels are:

- amenorrhea (lack of menstrual periods)
- galactorrhea (breastmilk production; less common in males)
- loss of axillary and pubic hair
- hypogonadism (reduced function of the gonads)
- gynecomastia (an increase in breast size in males)
- erectile dysfunction

Those that are caused directly by the mass itself are:

- headaches
- vision changes (visual field deficits, blurred vision, decreased visual acuity)
- cranial nerve palsies, especially with invasive tumors or with pituitary apoplexy
- rarely, seizures, hydrocephalus, and unilateral exophthalmos
- hypopituitarism
- pituitary apoplexy (A medical emergency caused by spontaneous hemorrhage of the tumor or sudden impaired blood supply into the pituitary gland. Symptoms include severe headache, vision changes, and acute panhypopituitarism. If untreated, the resulting lack of cortisol in the body—adrenal crisis—can be deadly.)

=== Infertility ===
A prolactinoma can cause infertility, temporary or permanent, in both male and female patients. It is one of the most common causes of infertility in women, with some sources estimating as much as 20% of female infertility being caused by hyperprolactinemia. It represents a smaller proportion of male infertility. However, among people who have prolactinomas, males are more likely to experience infertility, as their tumors are often more aggressive and more frequently cause hypogonadism.

== Causes ==
Prolactinoma is most frequently a sporadic tumor, occurring in people without any concrete risk factors or family members with similar conditions. In a minority of cases, genetics predispose the patient to having one or more pituitary gland tumors during their lifetime. Most cases of prolactinoma have no known causes or risk factors.

=== Pathogenesis ===
Though most pituitary tumors are sporadic, some genetic syndromes include increased risk for pituitary adenomas including Multiple endocrine neoplasia type 1 (caused by a mutation in the MEN1 gene), multiple endocrine neoplasia type 4 (MEN4 gene), Carney complex, and Familial isolated pituitary adenoma (FIPA). Despite their frequent association with genetic syndromes that cause multiple cancers in affected body tissues, the large majority of prolactinomas are monoclonal in origin (originating from a single cell developing a random mutation), even in cases where the tumor begins producing multiple distinct hormones aside from prolactin.

A micro-prolactinoma usually does not grow to become a macro-prolactinoma, and also does not often become metastatic. As such, it is considered a benign tumor, even if it causes symptoms due to excess prolactin. However, it is still recommended that patients with known microprolactinomas should receive an MRI and visual field assessment every 6 to 12 months, to detect unexpected progression and expansion of the tumor before it becomes an emergency.

==== Splicing factor 3B1 ====
Among cases of sporadic prolactinoma, in patients with no family history of pituitary tumors, the splicing factor 3B1 gene (SF3B1) has been found as a common causative mutation. This mutation, most commonly a missense mutation replacing a single amino acid, has also been identified in some familial cases of prolactinoma. However, it is more commonly a somatic mutation, occurring later in life in someone who was not born with the mutated gene. This gene is responsible for splicing a wide variety of RNA products inside the cell, and a mutation of it can thus cause the creation of numerous abnormal proteins as RNA templates are produced in unpredictable ways.

Sporadic cases of prolactinoma which are not related to a mutation of SF3B1 remain poorly understood. However, many studies show a link between estrogen and prolactinoma. This is theorized to be related to why prolactinomas are more common in women than men.

==== Vision problems and headaches ====
While headaches are a symptom common to any tumor within the cranium, vision problems are especially frequent in pituitary adenomas because the pituitary gland rests over the optic chiasm. As the tumor grows, it begins to compress one or both optic nerves, depending on the size and direction of growth. This is an example of mass effect. As such, smaller tumors which may produce excess prolactin or other hormones may not cause any vision problems, while still having major symptomatic effects on the body.

===== Other causes of elevated prolactin =====
The majority of moderately raised prolactin levels (up to 5000 mIU/L) are not due to microprolactinomas but other causes. The effects of some prescription drugs are the most common. Other causes are other pituitary tumours and normal pregnancy and breastfeeding.

== Diagnosis ==
Prolactinoma is often one of the first diagnoses considered by a physician when a patient presents with symptoms of hyperprolactinemia. Specifically, the presence of several of these symptoms in the same person are indicative of elevated prolactin:

- Galactorrhea
- Amenorrhea (in women)
- Erectile dysfunction (in men)
- Infertility
- Diminished libido
- Weight gain

If these symptoms occur with the simultaneous presence of mass effects, particularly vision problems or severe neurological symptoms such as seizures or coma, aggressive prolactinoma is highly likely. A patient with these symptoms should immediately undergo MRI to assess the size and extent of the tumor. MRI is also useful in patients with smaller tumors, as it can be used to monitor the tumor for signs of growth, allowing a surgical intervention to be performed before it becomes a medical emergency.

=== Imaging ===
All patients with hyperprolactinemia should receive MRI imaging to determine the size and characteristics of the tumor. Prolactinomas have somewhat variable appearance on MRI, most commonly appearing hypointense on T1 weighted MRI, and heterogenous or hyperintense on T2 weighted MRI. If MRI is not available, other imaging techniques may be used if they can examine the region around the sella turcica in sufficient detail. Identification of pituitary tumor on MRI, with accompanying symptoms, is considered a definitive diagnosis of prolactinoma.

Unlike macroprolactinomas which compress the optic nerves, microprolactinomas are usually not large enough to be seen on MRI. However, the addition of gadolinium contrast enhancement can make them much easier to detect. Thus, evaluation of a suspected prolactinoma usually uses this form of contrast enhancement. Notably, this contrast can also visualize a pituitary gland with no disease at all, so precise measurement of the gland's size and shape is essential.

=== Biochemical testing ===
Elevated prolactin levels in the patient's serum are indicative of hyperprolactinemia, but are not specific to prolactinoma, meaning that other diseases causing similar symptoms could produce the same test results. Similarly, tests that use dopamine agonists to suppress prolactin production are not able to rule out other diagnoses. As a result, biochemical testing is used only in a supplementary role, and MRI is the only definitive diagnostic tool available. Dopamine agonist testing can, however, be used to determine the effectiveness of DAs like bromocriptine as a potential non-surgical treatment option.

== Treatments ==
The goal of treatment is to return prolactin secretion to normal, reduce tumor size, correct any visual abnormalities, and restore normal pituitary function. The impact of stress should be ruled out before the diagnosis of prolactinoma is given. Exercise can significantly reduce stress and, thereby, prolactin levels. In the case of very large tumors, only partial reduction of the prolactin levels may be possible.

=== Medications ===
Dopamine is the chemical that normally inhibits prolactin secretion, so clinicians may treat prolactinoma with drugs that act like dopamine such as bromocriptine and cabergoline. This type of drug is called a dopamine agonist. These drugs shrink the tumor and return prolactin levels to normal in approximately 80% of patients. Both bromocriptine and cabergoline have been approved by the Food and Drug Administration for the treatment of hyperprolactinemia. Bromocriptine is associated with side-effects such as nausea and dizziness and hypotension in patients with already low blood pressure readings. To avoid these side-effects, it is important for bromocriptine treatment to start slowly.

Bromocriptine treatment should not be interrupted without consulting a qualified endocrinologist. Prolactin levels often rise again in most people when the drug is discontinued. In some, however, prolactin levels remain normal, so the doctor may suggest reducing or discontinuing treatment every two years on a trial basis. Recent studies have shown increased success in remission of prolactin levels after discontinuation, in patients having been treated for at least 2 years prior to cessation of bromocriptine treatment.

Cabergoline is also associated with side effects such as nausea and dizziness, but these may be less common and less severe than with bromocriptine. However, people with low blood pressure should use caution when starting cabergoline treatment, as the long half-life of the drug (4–7 days) may inadvertently affect their ability to keep their blood pressure within normal limits, creating intense discomfort, dizziness, and even fainting upon standing and walking until the single first dose clears from their system. As with bromocriptine therapy, side effects may be avoided or minimized if treatment is started slowly. If a patient's prolactin level remains normal for 6 months, a doctor may consider stopping treatment. Cabergoline should not be interrupted without consulting a qualified endocrinologist.

Other dopamine agonists that have been used less commonly to suppress prolactin include dihydroergocryptine, ergoloid, lisuride, metergoline, pergolide, quinagolide, and terguride.

=== Surgery ===
Surgery should be considered if medical therapy cannot be tolerated or if it fails to reduce prolactin levels, restore normal reproduction and pituitary function, and reduce tumor size. If medical therapy is only partially successful, this therapy should continue, possibly combined with surgery or radiation treatment.

The results of surgery depend a great deal on tumor size and prolactin level. The higher the prolactin level the lower the chance of normalizing serum prolactin. In the best medical centers, surgery corrects prolactin levels in 80% of patients with a serum prolactin less than 250 ng/ml. Even in patients with large tumors that cannot be completely removed, drug therapy may be able to return serum prolactin to the normal range after surgery. Depending on the size of the tumor and how much of it is removed, studies show that 20 to 50% will recur, usually within five years.

== Prognosis ==
People with microprolactinoma generally have an excellent prognosis. In 95% of cases, the tumor will not show any signs of growth after a 4 to 6-year period.

Macroprolactinomas often require more aggressive treatment otherwise they may continue to grow. There is no way to reliably predict the rate of growth, as it is different for every individual. Regular monitoring by a specialist to detect any major changes in the tumor is recommended.

=== Osteoporosis risk ===
Hyperprolactinemia can cause reduced estrogen production in women and reduced testosterone production in men. Although estrogen/testosterone production may be restored after treatment for hyperprolactinemia, even a year or two without estrogen/testosterone can compromise bone strength, and patients should protect themselves from osteoporosis by increasing exercise and calcium intake through diet or supplementation, and by avoiding smoking. Patients may want to have bone density measurements to assess the effect of estrogen/testosterone deficiency on bone density. They may also want to discuss testosterone/estrogen replacement therapy with their physician.

=== Pregnancy and oral birth control ===
If a woman has one or more small prolactinoma, there is no reason that she cannot conceive and have a normal pregnancy after successful medical therapy. The pituitary enlarges and prolactin production increases during normal pregnancy in women without pituitary disorders. Women with prolactin-secreting tumors may experience further pituitary enlargement and must be closely monitored during pregnancy. However, damage to the pituitary or eye nerves occurs in less than one percent of pregnant women with prolactinoma. In women with large tumors, the risk of damage to the pituitary or eye nerves is greater, and some doctors consider it as high as 25%. If a woman has completed a successful pregnancy, the chances of her completing further successful pregnancies are extremely high.

A woman with a prolactinoma should discuss her plans to conceive with her physician, so she can be carefully evaluated prior to becoming pregnant. This evaluation will include a magnetic resonance imaging (MRI) scan to assess the size of the tumor and an eye examination with measurement of visual fields. As soon as a patient is pregnant, her doctor will usually advise that she stop taking bromocriptine or cabergoline, the common treatments for prolactinoma. Most endocrinologists see patients every two months throughout the pregnancy. The patient should consult her endocrinologist promptly if she develops symptoms — in particular, headaches, visual changes, nausea, vomiting, excessive thirst or urination, or extreme lethargy. Bromocriptine or cabergoline treatment may be renewed and additional treatment may be required if the patient develops symptoms from growth of the tumor during pregnancy.

At one time, oral contraceptives were thought to contribute to the development of prolactinomas. However, this is no longer thought to be true. Patients with prolactinoma treated with bromocriptine or cabergoline may also take oral contraceptives. Likewise, post-menopausal estrogen replacement is safe in patients with prolactinoma treated with medical therapy or surgery.

== Epidemiology ==
Autopsy studies indicate that 6-25% of the U. S. population have small pituitary tumors. Forty percent of these pituitary tumors produce prolactin, but most are not considered clinically significant. Clinically significant pituitary tumors affect the health of approximately 14 out of 100,000 people. In non-selective surgical series, this tumor accounts for approximately 25-30% of all pituitary adenomas. Some growth hormone (GH)–producing tumors also co-secrete prolactin. More than 90% of prolactinoma is microprolactinomas, which are much more common than macroprolactinomas.

== See also ==
- Hypothalamic–pituitary–prolactin axis
- Hyperprolactinaemia
