= Prolactin-releasing hormone =

Prolactin-releasing hormone, also known as PRLH, is a hypothetical human hormone or hormone releasing factor. Existence of this factor has been hypothesized as prolactin is the only currently known hormone for which almost exclusively negative regulating factors are known (such as dopamine, leukemia inhibitory factor, some prostaglandins) but few stimulating factor. Its secretion is mediated by estrogen from placenta during pregnancy to elevate blood level of prolactin. While many prolactin stimulating and enhancing factors are well known (such as thyrotropin-releasing hormone, oxytocin, vasoactive intestinal peptide and estrogen) those have primary functions other than stimulating prolactin release and the search for hypothetical releasing factor or factors continues.

The prolactin-releasing peptide identified in 1998 was a candidate for this function, however as of 2008 it appears its function is not yet completely elucidated.

== See also ==
- Hypothalamic–pituitary–prolactin axis
