= Cabergoline =

Chemical compound

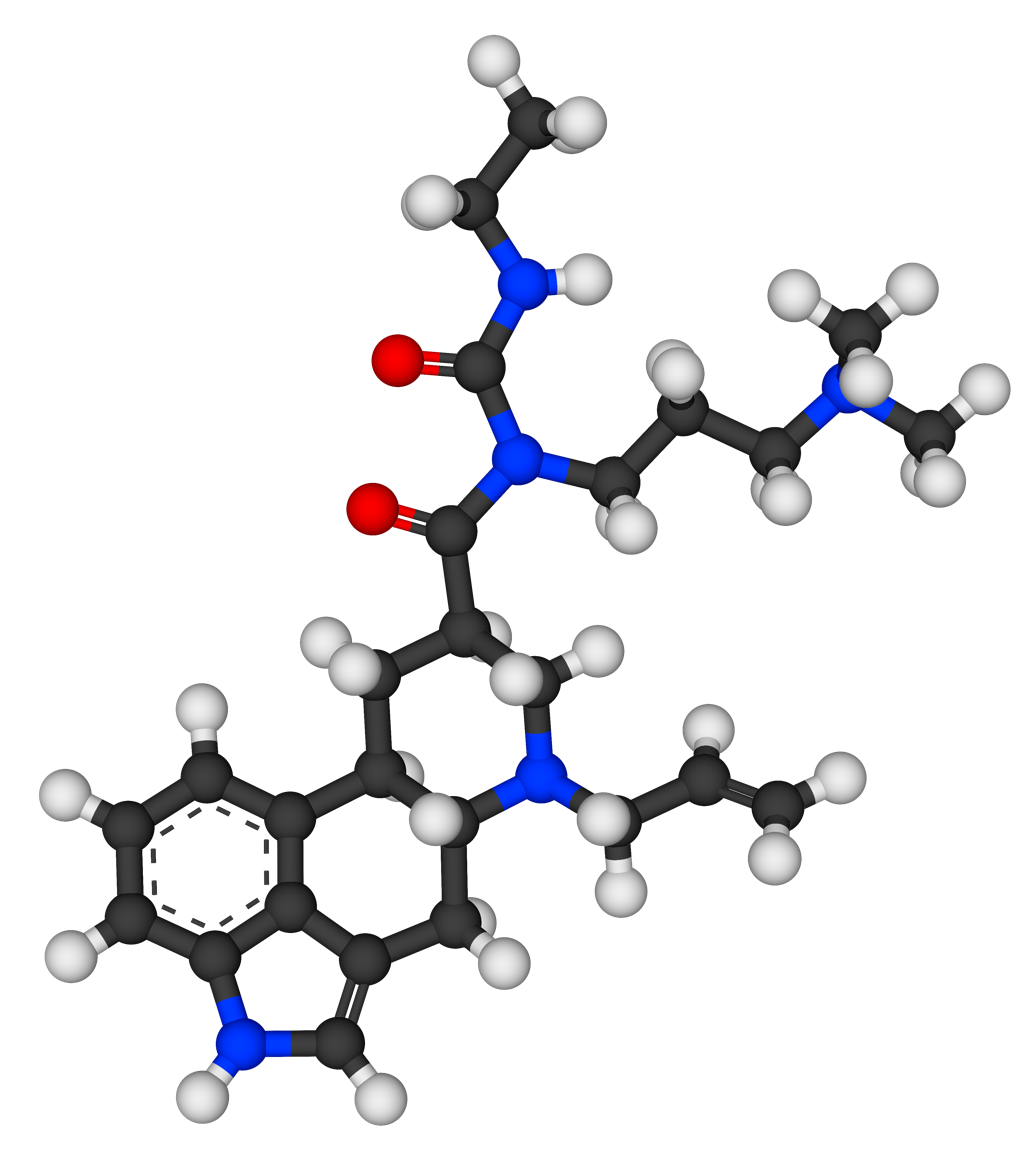

Clinical data
- Trade names: Dostinex, others
- Other names: N-[3-(Dimethylamino)propyl]-N-(ethylcarbamoyl)-6-(prop-2-en-1-yl)ergoline-8β-carboxamide
- AHFS/Drugs.com: Monograph
- License data: US DailyMed: Cabergoline
- Routes of administration: Oral
- ATC code: G02CB03 (WHO) N04BC06 (WHO)

Legal status
- Legal status: AU: S4 (Prescription only); US: ℞-only

Pharmacokinetic data
- Bioavailability: 50–80%
- Protein binding: Moderately bound (40–42%); concentration-independent
- Metabolism: Liver, predominately via hydrolysis of the acylurea bond or the urea moiety
- Elimination half-life: 63–69 hours (estimated)
- Excretion: Urine (22%), feces (60%)

Identifiers
- IUPAC name: (6aR,9R,10aR)-N-[3-(dimethylamino)propyl]-N-(ethylcarbamoyl)-7-prop-2-enyl-6,6a,8,9,10,10a-hexahydro-4H-indolo[4,3-fg]quinoline-9-carboxamide
- CAS Number: 81409-90-7
- PubChem CID: 54746
- IUPHAR/BPS: 37
- DrugBank: DB00248
- ChemSpider: 49452
- UNII: LL60K9J05T
- KEGG: D00987
- ChEBI: CHEBI:3286
- ChEMBL: ChEMBL1201087
- CompTox Dashboard (EPA): DTXSID6022719
- ECHA InfoCard: 100.155.380

Chemical and physical data
- Formula: C_{26}H_{37}N_{5}O_{2}
- Molar mass: 451.615 g·mol^{−1}
- 3D model (JSmol): Interactive image
- SMILES: [H][C@]12C[C@@H](C(=O)N(CCCN(C)C)C(=O)NCC)CN(CC=C)[C@]1([H])Cc3c[nH]c4cccc2c34
- InChI: InChI=1S/C26H37N5O2/c1-5-11-30-17-19(25(32)31(26(33)27-6-2)13-8-12-29(3)4)14-21-20-9-7-10-22-24(20)18(16-28-22)15-23(21)30/h5,7,9-10,16,19,21,23,28H,1,6,8,11-15,17H2,2-4H3,(H,27,33)/t19-,21-,23-/m1/s1; Key:KORNTPPJEAJQIU-KJXAQDMKSA-N

Cabergoline, sold under the brand name Dostinex among others, is a dopaminergic medication used in the treatment of high prolactin levels, prolactinomas, Parkinson's disease, and for other indications. It is taken by mouth.

Cabergoline is an ergot derivative and a potent dopamine D_{2} receptor agonist.

Cabergoline was patented in 1980 and approved for medical use in 1993. It is on the World Health Organization's List of Essential Medicines.

== Medical uses ==
Medical uses of cabergoline include:

- Lactation suppression
- Hyperprolactinemia
- Adjunctive therapy of prolactin-producing pituitary gland tumors (prolactinomas);
- Monotherapy of Parkinson's disease in the early phase;
- Combination therapy, together with levodopa and a decarboxylase inhibitor such as carbidopa, in progressive-phase Parkinson's disease;
- In some countries also: ablactation and dysfunctions associated with hyperprolactinemia (amenorrhea, oligomenorrhea, anovulation, nonpuerperal mastitis and galactorrhea);
- Treatment of uterine fibroids.
- Adjunctive therapy of acromegaly: Cabergoline has low efficacy in suppressing growth hormone levels and is highly efficient in suppressing hyperprolactinemia, which is present in 20–30% of acromegaly cases. Growth hormone and prolactin are similar structurally and have similar effects in many target tissues; therefore, targeting prolactin may help symptoms when growth hormone secretion cannot be sufficiently controlled by other methods.

Cabergoline is frequently used as a first-line agent in the management of prolactinomas due to its higher affinity for D_{2} receptor sites, less severe side effects, and more convenient dosing schedule than the older bromocriptine, though in pregnancy bromocriptine is often still chosen since there is less data on safety in pregnancy for cabergoline.

=== Off-label ===
Cabergoline has at times been used as an adjunct to SSRI antidepressants as there is some evidence that it counteracts certain side effects of those drugs, such as reduced libido and anorgasmia. It also has been suggested that it has a possible recreational use in reducing or eliminating the male refractory period, thereby allowing men to experience multiple ejaculatory orgasms in rapid succession, and at least two scientific studies support those speculations. Additionally, a systematic review and meta-analysis concluded that prophylactic treatment with cabergoline reduces the incidence, but not the severity, of ovarian hyperstimulation syndrome (OHSS), without compromising pregnancy outcomes, in females undergoing stimulated cycles of in vitro fertilization (IVF). Also, a study on rats found that cabergoline reduces voluntary alcohol consumption, possibly by increasing GDNF expression in the ventral tegmental area. It may be used in the treatment of restless legs syndrome.. Oral administration of cabergoline was faced with gastrointestinal problems which cause poor compliance in patients. One of the preferred solutions is to use non-oral dosage forms like suppositories. Vaginal suppositories have ease of use and could hinder gastrointestinal effects of cabergoline.

=== Pregnancy and lactation ===
Relatively little is known about the effects of this medication during pregnancy and lactation. In some cases the related bromocriptine may be an alternative when pregnancy is expected.

- Pregnancy: available preliminary data indicates a somewhat increased rate of congenital abnormalities in patients who became pregnant while treated with cabergoline.. However, one study concluded that "foetal exposure to cabergoline through early pregnancy does not induce any increase in the risk of miscarriage or foetal malformation."
- Lactation: In rats cabergoline was found in the maternal milk. Since it is not known if this effect also occurs in humans, breastfeeding is usually not recommended if/when treatment with cabergoline is necessary.
- Lactation suppression: In some countries cabergoline (Dostinex) is sometimes used as a lactation suppressant. It is also used in veterinary medicine to treat false pregnancy in dogs.

== Contraindications ==
Contraindications of cabergoline include:

- Hypersensitivity to ergot derivatives
- Pediatric patients (no clinical experience)
- Severely impaired liver function or cholestasis
- Concomitant use with drugs metabolized mainly by CYP450 enzymes such as erythromycin and ketoconazole, because increased plasma levels of cabergoline may result (although cabergoline undergoes minimal CYP450 metabolism).
- Cautions: severe cardiovascular disease, Raynaud's disease, gastroduodenal ulcers, active gastrointestinal bleeding, hypotension.

== Side effects ==
Side effects are mostly dose dependent. Much more severe side effects are reported for treatment of Parkinson's disease and (off-label treatment) for restless leg syndrome which both typically require very high doses. The side effects are considered mild when used for treatment of hyperprolactinemia and other endocrine disorders or gynecologic indications where the typical dose is one hundredth to one tenth that for Parkinson's disease.

Cabergoline requires slow dose titration (2–4 weeks for hyperprolactinemia, often much longer for other conditions) to minimize side effects. The extremely long bioavailability of the medication may complicate dosing regimens during titration and require particular precautions.

Cabergoline is considered the best tolerable option for hyperprolactinemia treatment although the newer and less tested quinagolide may offer similarly favourable side effect profile with quicker titration times.

Approximately 200 patients with newly diagnosed Parkinson's disease participated in a clinical study of cabergoline monotherapy. Seventy-six (76) percent reported at least one side effect. These side effects were chiefly mild or moderate:

- GI tract: Side effects were extremely frequent. Fifty-three percent of patients reported side effects. Very frequent: Nausea (30%), constipation (22%), and dry mouth (10%). Frequent: Gastric irritation (7%), vomiting (5%), and dyspepsia (2%).
- Psychiatric disturbances and central nervous system (CNS): Altogether 51 percent of patients were affected. Very frequent: Sleep disturbances (somnolence 18%, insomnia 11%), vertigo (27%), and depression (13%). Frequent: dyskinesia (4%) and hallucinations (4%).
- Cardiovascular: Approximately 30 percent of patients experienced side effects. Most frequent were hypotension (10%), peripheral edema (14%) and non-specific edema (2%). Arrhythmias were encountered in 4.8%, palpitations in 4.3%, and angina pectoris in 1.4%.

In a combination study with 2,000 patients also treated with levodopa, the incidence and severity of side effects was comparable to monotherapy. Encountered side effects required a termination of cabergoline treatment in 15% of patients. Additional side effects were infrequent cases of hematological side effects, and an occasional increase in liver enzymes or serum creatinine without signs or symptoms.

As with other ergot derivatives, pleuritis, exudative pleura disease, pleura fibrosis, lung fibrosis, and pericarditis are seen. These side effects are noted in less than 2% of patients. They require immediate termination of treatment. Clinical improvement and normalization of X-ray findings are normally seen soon after cabergoline withdrawal. It appears that the dose typically used for treatment of hyperprolactinemia is too low to cause this type of side effects.

=== Valvular heart disease ===
In two studies published in the New England Journal of Medicine on January 4, 2007, cabergoline was implicated along with pergolide in causing valvular heart disease. As a result of this, the FDA removed pergolide from the U.S. market on March 29, 2007. Since cabergoline is not approved in the U.S. for Parkinson's Disease, but for hyperprolactinemia, the drug remains on the market. The lower doses required for treatment of hyperprolactinemia have been found to be not associated with clinically significant valvular heart disease or cardiac valve regurgitation.

== Interactions ==
No interactions were noted with levodopa or selegiline. The drug should not be combined with other ergot derivatives. Dopamine antagonists such as antipsychotics and metoclopramide counteract some effects of cabergoline. The use of antihypertensive drugs should be intensively monitored because excessive hypotension may result from the combination.

== Pharmacology ==
=== Pharmacodynamics ===
Activities of cabergoline at various sites
Site	Affinity (K_{i} [nM])	Efficacy (E_{max} [%])	Action
D_{1}	214–32,000	?	Agonist
D_{2S}	0.5–0.62	102	Superagonist
D_{2L}	0.95	75	Partial agonist
D_{3}	0.80–1.0	86	Full agonist
D_{4}	56	49	Partial agonist
D_{5}	22	?	Agonist
5-HT_{1A}	1.9–20	93	Full agonist
5-HT_{1B}	479	102	Superagonist
5-HT_{1D}	8.7	68	Partial agonist
5-HT_{2A}	4.6–6.2	94	Full agonist
5-HT_{2B}	1.2–9.4	98	Full agonist
5-HT_{2C}	5.8–692	96	Full agonist
5-HT_{3}	>10,000	–	–
5-HT_{4}	3,000	?	?
5-HT_{6}	1,300	?	?
5-HT_{7}	2.5	?	Antagonist
α_{1A}	288–>10,000	0	Binder
α_{1B}	60–1,000	?	Binder
α_{1D}	166	?	Binder
α_{2A}	12–132	0	Antagonist
α_{2B}	17–72	0	Antagonist
α_{2C}	22–364	0	Antagonist
α_{2D}	3.6	?	?
H_{1}	1,380	?	?
M_{1}	>10,000	–	–
SERT	>10,000	–	–
Notes: All sites are human except α_{2D}-adrenergic, which is rat (no human counterpart). Negligible affinity (>10,000 nM) for various other receptors (β_{1}- and β_{2}-adrenergic, adenosine, GABA, glutamate, glycine, nicotinic acetylcholine, opioid, prostanoid). Sources:

Cabergoline is a long-acting dopamine D_{2} receptor agonist. In-vitro rat studies show a direct inhibitory effect of cabergoline on the prolactin secretion in the lactotroph cells of the pituitary gland and cabergoline decreases serum prolactin levels in reserpinized rats. Although cabergoline is commonly described principally as a D_{2} receptor agonist, it also possesses significant affinity for the dopamine D_{3}, and D_{4}, serotonin 5-HT_{1A}, 5-HT_{2A}, 5-HT_{2B}, and 5-HT_{2C}, and α_{2}-adrenergic receptors, as well as moderate/low affinity for the dopamine D_{1}, serotonin 5-HT_{7}, and α_{1}-adrenergic receptors. Cabergoline functions as a partial or full agonist at all of these receptors except for the 5-HT_{7}, α_{1}-adrenergic, and α_{2}-adrenergic receptors, where it acts as an antagonist. Cabergoline has been associated with cardiac valvulopathy due to activation of 5-HT_{2B} receptors.

Ergot derivatives like cabergoline have been described as non-hallucinogenic in spite of acting as serotonin 5-HT_{2A} receptor agonists.

=== Pharmacokinetics ===
Following a single oral dose, resorption of cabergoline from the gastrointestinal (GI) tract is highly variable, typically occurring within 0.5 to 4 hours. Ingestion with food does not alter its absorption rate. Human bioavailability has not been determined since the drug is intended for oral use only. In mice and rats the absolute bioavailability has been determined to be 30 and 63 percent, respectively. Cabergoline is rapidly and extensively metabolized in the liver and excreted in bile and to a lesser extent in urine. All metabolites are less active than the parental drug or inactive altogether. The human elimination half-life is estimated to be 63 to 68 hours in patients with Parkinson's disease and 79 to 115 hours in patients with pituitary tumors. Average elimination half-life is 80 hours. The metabolism of cabergoline is mediated by unidentified enzymes via a hepatic route and mainly consists of hydrolysis and oxidation by the alkylurea group and oxidation at the alkene.

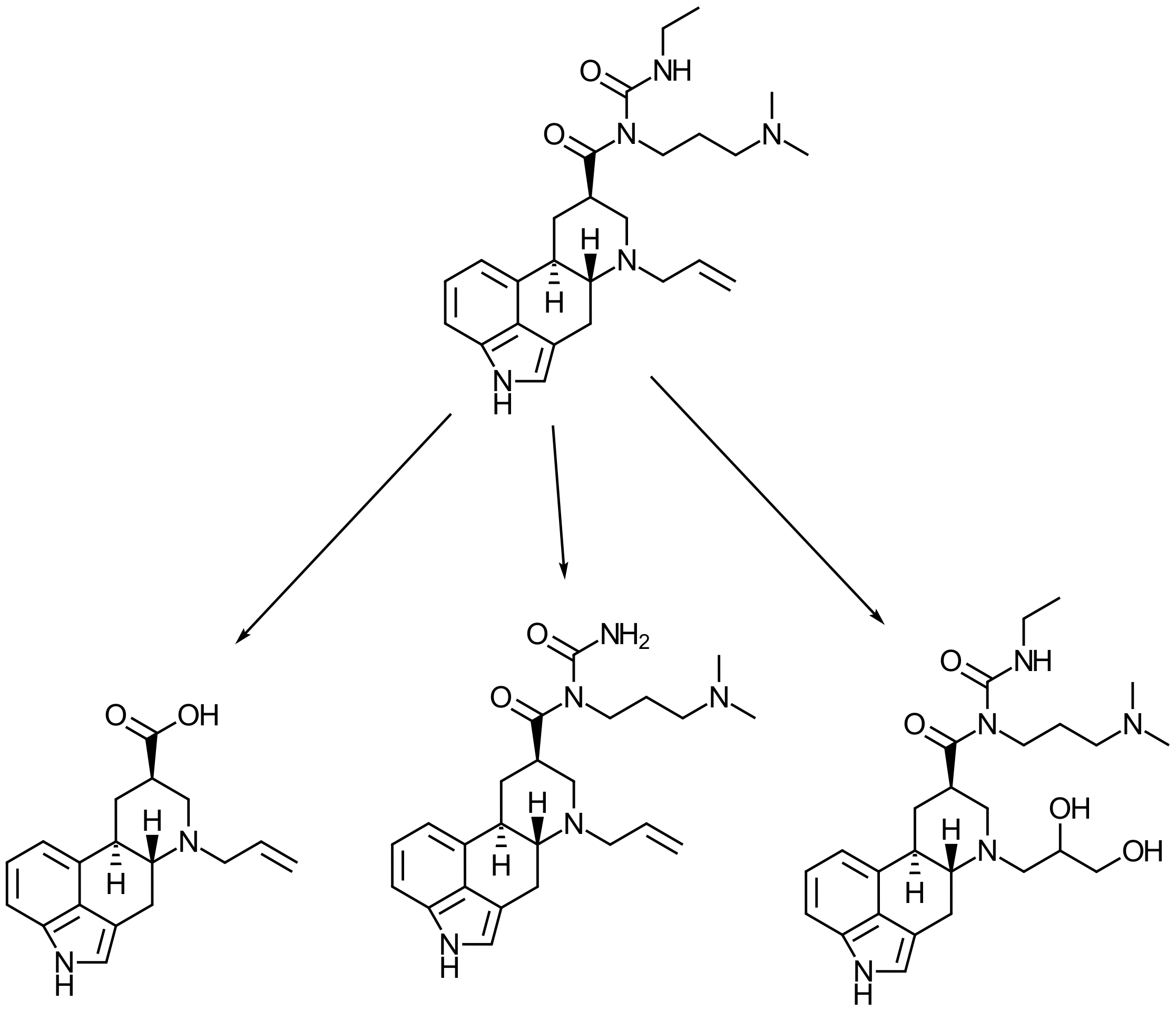

== History ==
Cabergoline was first synthesized by scientists working for the Italian drug company Farmitalia-Carlo Erba in Milan who were experimenting with semisynthetic derivatives of the ergot alkaloids, and a patent application was filed in 1980. The first publication was a scientific abstract at the Society for Neuroscience meeting in 1991.

Farmitalia-Carlo Erba was acquired by Pharmacia in 1993, which in turn was acquired by Pfizer in 2003.

Cabergoline was first marketed in The Netherlands as Dostinex in 1992. The drug was approved by the FDA on December 23, 1996. It went generic in late 2005 following US patent expiration.

== Society and culture ==
=== Brand names ===
Brand names of cabergoline include Cabaser, Dostinex, Galastop (veterinary), and Kelactin (veterinary), among others.

== Research ==
Cabergoline was studied in one person with Cushing's disease, to lower adrenocorticotropic hormone (ACTH) levels and cause regression of ACTH-producing pituitary adenomas.

== See also ==
- Substituted lysergamide
