= Galactagogue =

Substance promoting lactation

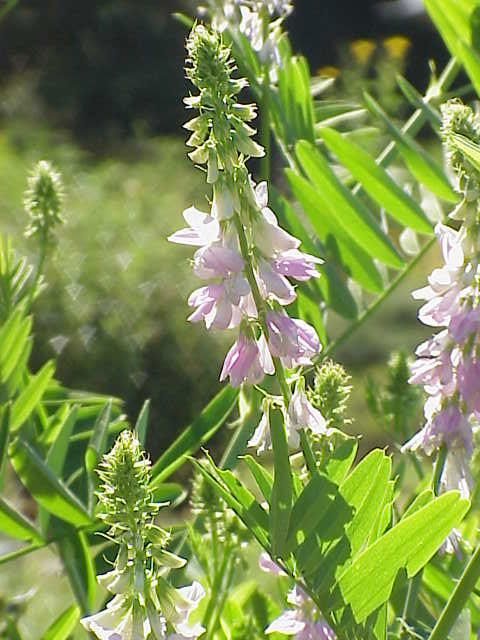
Goat's rue (Galega officinalis) is one plant that is thought to promote lactation

A galactagogue, or galactogogue (from Greek: γάλα [γαλακτ-], milk, + ἀγωγός, leading), also known as a lactation inducer or milk booster, is a substance that promotes lactation in humans and other animals. It may be synthetic, plant-derived, or endogenous. They may be used to induce lactation and to treat low milk supply.

== Pharmaceutical ==
Synthetic galactagogues such as domperidone and metoclopramide interact with the dopamine system in such a way to increase the production of prolactin; specifically, by blocking the D_{2} receptor. There is some evidence to suggest that mothers who are unable to meet their infants' breastfeeding needs may benefit from galactogogues. A more recent study questions the effectiveness of commercial lactation cookies finding no significant difference. Galactagogues may be considered when non-pharmacologic interventions are found to be insufficient. For example, domperidone may be an option for mothers of preterm babies who at over 14 days from delivery and after full lactation support still have difficulty expressing breast milk in sufficient quantity for their child's needs. Lactation induction may also be possible in certain circumstances for women planning to adopt an infant.

Domperidone (like metoclopramide, a D_{2} receptor antagonist) is not approved for enhanced lactation in the USA. By contrast, Australian guidelines consider domperidone to be the preferred galactagogue when non-pharmacological approaches have proved insufficient. Unlike metoclopramide, domperidone does not cross the blood–brain barrier and does not tend to have adverse effects such as drowsiness or depression.

Other drugs which may increase lactation include:

- Antipsychotics such as risperidone, chlorpromazine and sulpiride, due to their ability to block the D_{2} receptor
- Certain hormones such as oxytocin, growth hormone (GH), and thyrotropin-releasing hormone (TRH).

Progestogens like progesterone, medroxyprogesterone acetate, and cyproterone acetate have been found to produce lobuloalveolar development of the breasts, which is important for lactation as milk is produced in the mammary lobules.

== Herbal ==
Herbals and foods used as galactagogues have little or no scientific evidence of efficacy, and the identity and purity of herbals are concerns because of inadequate testing requirements. The herbals most commonly cited as galactagogues are:

- Shatavari (Asparagus racemosus)
- Fenugreek (Trigonella foenumgraecum)
- Torbangun (Coleus amboinicus), which has been used by the Batak people of Indonesia as a galactogogue for hundreds of years.
- Fennel (Foeniculum vulgare)
- Milk thistle (Silybum marianum); in 2010 the European Food Safety Authority considered and rejected a claim for silybum as a galactagogue because the evidence was deemed insufficient.
- Chasteberry (Vitex agnus-castus)
- Goat's rue (Galega officinalis)

Other herbals that have been claimed to be galactagogues include:

- Blessed thistle
- Alfalfa
- Anise
- Nettle
- Oatmeal
- Vervain
- Red raspberry leaf
- Marshmallow (althaea) root
- Moringa

== See also ==
- Galactorrhea
- Herbalism
- Hypothalamic–pituitary–prolactin axis
