= Prolactin-releasing peptide receptor =

Protein-coding gene in the species Homo sapiens

PRLHR

Identifiers
- Aliases: PRLHR, GPR10, GR3, PrRPR, prolactin releasing hormone receptor
- External IDs: OMIM: 600895; MGI: 2135956; GeneCards: PRLHR

Gene location (Human)
Chr.	Chromosome 10 (human)
Band	10q26.11	Start	118,589,997 bp
Band	10q26.11	End	118,595,648 bp

Gene location (Mouse)
Chr.	Chromosome 19 (mouse)
Band	19|19 D3	Start	60,455,170 bp
Band	19|19 D3	End	60,456,742 bp
RNA expression pattern
Bgee	Human / Mouse (ortholog); Top expressed in: pituitary gland; anterior pituitary; islet of Langerhans; hypothalamus; substantia nigra; prefrontal cortex; body of uterus; vagina; myometrium; smooth muscle tissue / Top expressed in: hypothalamus; cerebellum; cerebellar cortex; striatum of neuraxis; mesencephalon; More reference expression data
BioGPS	n/a
Gene ontology
Molecular function	neuropeptide Y receptor activity; G protein-coupled receptor activity; protein binding; signal transducer activity; neuropeptide receptor activity
Cellular component	integral component of membrane; plasma membrane; integral component of plasma membrane; membrane; cilium
Biological process	female pregnancy; G protein-coupled receptor signaling pathway; hormone metabolic process; feeding behavior; signal transduction; neuropeptide signaling pathway; chemical synaptic transmission
Sources:Amigo / QuickGO
Orthologs
Databases	NCBI: entry; OMA: entry
Species	Human	Mouse
Entrez	2834	226278
Ensembl	ENSG00000119973	ENSMUSG00000045052
UniProt	P49683	Q6VMN6
RefSeq (mRNA)	NM_004248	NM_201615
RefSeq (protein)	NP_004239	NP_963909
Location (UCSC)	Chr 10: 118.59 – 118.6 Mb	Chr 19: 60.46 – 60.46 Mb
PubMed search
- Wikidata
View/Edit Human	View/Edit Mouse

The prolactin-releasing peptide receptor (PrRPR) also known as G-protein coupled receptor 10 (GPR10) is a protein that in humans is encoded by the PRLHR gene.

PrRPR is a G-protein coupled receptor that binds the prolactin-releasing peptide (PRLH).

== Function ==
PrRPR is a 7-transmembrane domain receptor for prolactin-releasing peptide that is highly expressed in the anterior pituitary.
