= Prolactin-releasing peptide =

Protein-coding gene in the species Homo sapiens

PRLH

Identifiers
- Aliases: PRLH, PRH, PRRP, prolactin releasing hormone
- External IDs: OMIM: 602663; MGI: 3644668; GeneCards: PRLH

Gene location (Human)
Chr.	Chromosome 2 (human)
Band	2q37.3	Start	237,566,574 bp
Band	2q37.3	End	237,567,175 bp

Gene location (Mouse)
Chr.	Chromosome 1 (mouse)
Band	1|1 D	Start	90,880,830 bp
Band	1|1 D	End	90,881,749 bp
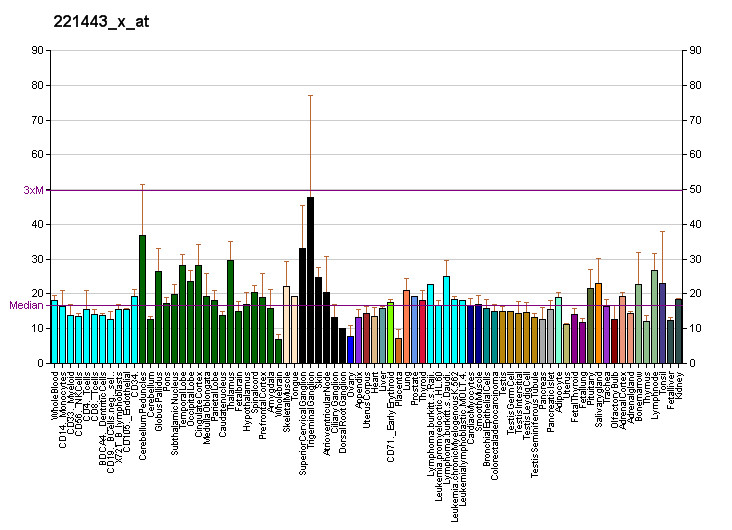
RNA expression pattern
Bgee	Human / Mouse (ortholog); Top expressed in: pancreatic ductal cell; tendon of biceps brachii; right auricle of heart; skin of thigh; right uterine tube; optic nerve; face; sensory organ; lower respiratory tract; mucosa of nose / Top expressed in: blastocyst; granulocyte; bone marrow; cerebellar cortex; colon; hypothalamus; duodenum; human kidney; proximal tubule; yolk sac; More reference expression data
BioGPS	More reference expression data
Gene ontology
Molecular function	neuropeptide hormone activity; prolactin-releasing peptide receptor binding; hormone activity
Cellular component	cytoplasm; extracellular region
Biological process	tissue homeostasis; reduction of food intake in response to dietary excess; energy reserve metabolic process; lipid metabolism; G protein-coupled receptor signaling pathway; response to glucose; response to insulin; regulation of multicellular organism growth; fat cell differentiation; autonomic nervous system development; response to dietary excess; response to peptide hormone; eating behavior; feeding behavior; regulation of signaling receptor activity
Sources:Amigo / QuickGO
Orthologs
Databases	NCBI: entry; OMA: entry
Species	Human	Mouse
Entrez	51052	623503
Ensembl	ENSG00000071677	ENSMUSG00000090550
UniProt	P81277	G3UWC3
RefSeq (mRNA)	NM_015893	NM_001101647
RefSeq (protein)	NP_056977	NP_001095117
Location (UCSC)	Chr 2: 237.57 – 237.57 Mb	Chr 1: 90.88 – 90.88 Mb
PubMed search
- Wikidata
View/Edit Human	View/Edit Mouse

Prolactin-releasing peptide (PrRP) is a peptide hormone that in humans is encoded by the PRLH gene. PrRP binds to the receptor PrRPR and seems to be involved in appetite regulation, but its precise function isn’t fully understood. Though early research suggested that PrRP stimulates prolactin (PRL) release, hence its name, this potential function is debated. Unlike other anterior pituitary hormones, the hypothalamus seems to primarily regulate prolactin release through inhibition, mostly via dopamine as part of the hypothalamic–pituitary–prolactin axis.

== Description ==
PrRP has 20 amino acids, and is a member of the RFamide peptide family.

During the discovery process, PrRP was found to be a ligand for an orphan G-protein coupled receptor (GPR 10). Preliminary in vitro studies showed it to stimulate the secretion of prolactin from lactotropic cells, hence its name. Now, however, the function of PrRP in the brain is understood in terms of negative regulation of appetite.

PrRP is produced by noradrenergic neurons A1 and A2 in the solitary nucleus, and also by neurons in the hypothalamus.
