= Metergoline =

Chemical compound

Clinical data
- Trade names: Contralac, Liserdol
- Other names: Methergoline; FI-6337; [(8β)-1,6-Dimethylergolin-8-yl)methyl]carbamic acid phenylmethyl ester
- Routes of administration: Oral
- ATC code: G02CB05 (WHO)

Legal status
- Legal status: In general: ℞ (Prescription only)

Identifiers
- IUPAC name: benzyl N-[[(6aR,9S,10aR)-4,7-dimethyl-6,6a,8,9,10,10a-hexahydroindolo[4,3-fg]quinolin-9-yl]methyl]carbamate
- CAS Number: 17692-51-2
- PubChem CID: 28693
- IUPHAR/BPS: 133
- ChemSpider: 26687
- UNII: 1501393LY5
- ChEBI: CHEBI:64216
- ChEMBL: ChEMBL19215
- CompTox Dashboard (EPA): DTXSID5042584
- ECHA InfoCard: 100.037.881

Chemical and physical data
- Formula: C_{25}H_{29}N_{3}O_{2}
- Molar mass: 403.526 g·mol^{−1}
- 3D model (JSmol): Interactive image
- SMILES: O=C(OCc1ccccc1)NC[C@@H]3C[C@@H]4c5cccc2c5c(cn2C)C[C@H]4N(C3)C
- InChI: InChI=1S/C25H29N3O2/c1-27-14-18(13-26-25(29)30-16-17-7-4-3-5-8-17)11-21-20-9-6-10-22-24(20)19(12-23(21)27)15-28(22)2/h3-10,15,18,21,23H,11-14,16H2,1-2H3,(H,26,29)/t18-,21+,23+/m0/s1; Key:WZHJKEUHNJHDLS-QTGUNEKASA-N

Metergoline (INN, BAN), also known as methergoline and sold under the brand names Contralac (veterinary) and Liserdol (clinical), is a monoaminergic medication of the ergoline group which is used as a prolactin inhibitor in the treatment of hyperprolactinemia (high prolactin levels) and to suppress lactation.

== Pharmacology ==
=== Pharmacodynamics ===
Metergoline is a ligand of various serotonin and dopamine receptors.

Activities of metergoline at various sites
Site	Affinity (K_{i} [nM])	Efficacy (E_{max} [%])	Action
5-HT_{1A}	4.3	?	Antagonist
5-HT_{1B}	5.2–36	?	Partial agonist
5-HT_{1D}	0.60–11.7	?	Partial agonist
5-HT_{1E}	776–1,122	?	?
5-HT_{1F}	339–341	?	?
5-HT_{2A}	0.12–2.3	?	Antagonist
5-HT_{2B}	0.71–1.8	?	Antagonist
5-HT_{2C}	0.18–1.8	?	Antagonist
5-HT_{3}	>5,000–7,400	?	?
5-HT_{4}	354	?	?
5-HT_{5A}	630	?	?
5-HT_{5B}	1,000	?	?
5-HT_{6}	61–400	?	?
5-HT_{7}	6.4–6.5	?	Antagonist
D_{2}	?	?	Agonist
Notes: All sites are human except 5-HT_{3} (rat/pig), 5-HT_{4} (pig), and 5-HT_{5B} (rat—no human counterpart).
