= Hypoprolactinemia =

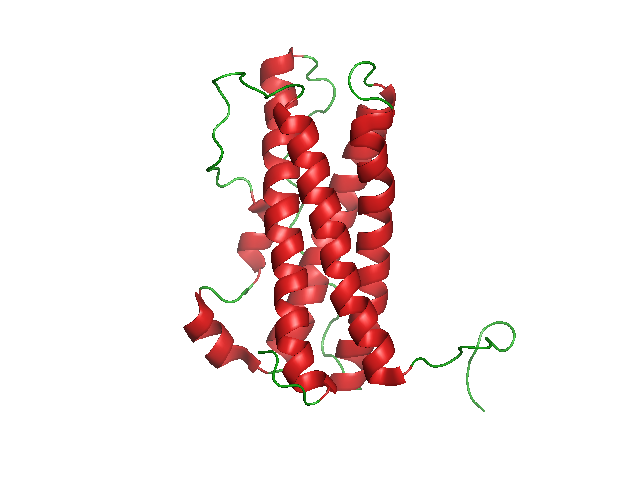
- Prolactin
- Specialty: Gynecology

Hypoprolactinemia is a medical condition characterized by a deficiency in the serum levels of the hypothalamic-pituitary hormone prolactin.

== Signs and symptoms ==
Hypoprolactinemia is associated with ovarian dysfunction in women, and, in men, metabolic syndrome, anxiety symptoms, arteriogenic erectile dysfunction, premature ejaculation, oligozoospermia (low concentration of sperm in semen), asthenospermia (reduced sperm motility), hypofunction of seminal vesicles, and hypoandrogenism. In one study, normal sperm characteristics were restored when prolactin levels were brought up to normal values in men with hypoprolactinemia. Hypoprolactinemia can be a cause of lactation failure after childbirth.

== Causes ==
Hypoprolactinemia can result from autoimmune disease, hypopituitarism, growth hormone deficiency, hypothyroidism, excessive dopamine action in the tuberoinfundibular pathway and/or the anterior pituitary, and ingestion of drugs that activate the D_{2} receptor, such as direct D_{2} receptor agonists like bromocriptine and pergolide, and indirect D_{2} receptor activators like amphetamines (through the induction of dopamine release).

== Diagnosis ==
Guidelines for diagnosing hypoprolactinemia are defined as prolactin levels below 3 μg/L in women, and 5 μg/L in men.

== Management ==
There are few treatments which increase prolactin levels in humans. Treatment differs based on the reason for diagnosis. Women who are diagnosed with hypoprolactinemia following lactation failure are typically advised to formula feed, although treatment with metoclopramide has been shown to increase milk supply in clinical studies. For subfertility, treatment may include clomiphene citrate or gonadotropins.

== See also ==
- Hypothalamic–pituitary–prolactin axis
- Hyperprolactinemia
