= Macroprolactin =

Inactive form of prolactin

Macroprolactin is the term used to describe complexed forms of the pituitary hormone prolactin which are found in blood. The most common complex found in blood consists of prolactin and immunoglobulin G (IgG). While the free prolactin hormone is active, prolactin in the macroprolactin complex does not have any biological activity in the body and is considered benign. However, macroprolactin is detected by all Laboratory tests that measure prolactin in blood. This leads to misdiagnosis of hyperprolactinaemia in many people, especially those with other symptoms, such as infertility or menstrual problems.

"Macroprolactin" is most commonly a complex of prolactin and IgG (typically IgG4), displaying a molecular weight of approximately 150 kDa (which is hence 6–7 fold higher that the native molecule). Polymeric aggregate of highly glycosylated prolactin monomers or prolactin-IgA complexes (i.e. non-IgG-type macroprolactin) act similarly and also count as "macroprolactin".

In patients with hyperprolactinemia, the serum pattern of prolactin isoforms usually encompasses 60%–90% monomeric prolactin, 15%–30% big-prolactin (40–60 kDa: usually prolactin dimers or big-big degradation products) and 0%–10% big-big prolactin (>100 kDa). The condition of macroprolactinaemia is hence defined as predominance (i.e. >30%–60%) of circulating prolactin isoforms with molecular weight >100 kDa.

There are certain chemicals, such as polyethylene glycol, that can be added to remove macroprolactin from a suspicious sample. The sample can then be re-analysed to see if the prolactin levels are still high. The gold standard test to diagnose macroprolactin is gel-filtration chromatography.

== Literature ==
- Sadideen H, Swaminathan R. (2006): "Macroprolactin: what is it and what is its importance?" Int J Clin Pract. 60(4):457-61.
