= Prolactin cell =

Pituitary gland cell which produces the hormone prolactin

Details
- System: Endocrine system
- Location: Anterior pituitary gland
- Function: Prolactin production

Identifiers
- MeSH: D052682
- TH: H3.08.02.2.00022
- FMA: 83096

A prolactin cell (also known as a lactotroph, mammotroph, or lactotrope) is a specialized endocrine cell located in the anterior pituitary gland in most vertebrates. Its primary role is to secrete the peptide hormone prolactin. In mammals, prolactin serves multiple reproductive and homeostatic roles within an organism, including stimulation of lactation, mammary tissue development, regulation of the immune response, and activity of the central nervous system. Prolactin cells constitute approximately 20-55% of the population of cells within the anterior pituitary gland, depending on the sex, physiological status, and species of the animal. Women characteristically exhibit higher levels of prolactin activity as compared to men. Males and non-pregnant, non-lactating females typically have low levels of prolactin. The number for prolactin cells in a pregnant female will increase to allow for breast tissue development.

Prolactin cells are regulated by dopamine, estrogen, and thyrotropin-releasing hormone. The monitoring of the activity and secretion of prolactin cells provides clinical significance for reproductive and endocrine disorders within the body.

== Location and characteristics ==
The location of prolactin cells within the pituitary gland is regulated largely by the hypothalamus. The pituitary gland is divided into posterior and anterior regions. Within the anterior pituitary gland are the prolactin cells, where they secrete the hormone prolactin. Prolactin cells vary in number, size, and appearance depending on female reproductive status. Prolactin cells specifically increase in response to the physiological state of pregnancy, in particular, the need for the development of breast tissues and milk production. During pregnancy, prolactin cells will undergo hypertrophy (enlarging to support increased prolactin production) as well as hyperplasia (an increase in cell number). The pituitary gland increases in size due to the amount of prolactin cells. The secretory granules of prolactin cells fluctuate from sparsely granulated (during periods of low prolactin production) to densely granulated (during periods of high prolactin production). Prolactin cells contain a large amount of rough endoplasmic reticulum, where prolactin synthesis occurs. The trans-Golgi layer is responsible for storing the prolactin hormone into secretory granules, which are dissolved upon secretion out of the cell. Lysosomal enzymes are involved in the degradation of the secretory granules. The prolactin hormone is a single polypeptide chain protein composed of 199 amino acids in humans. It consists of “three intramolecular disulfide bonds located between six cysteine residues (Cys4-Cys11, Cys58-Cys174, and Cys191-Cys199”.

== Function ==
Prolactin cells are best known for their role in female reproduction, particularly in stimulating the growth of mammary tissue and promoting lactation (milk production). Beyond female reproduction and common to both sexes, the prolactin hormone released by prolactin cells contribute to other physiological processes such as the regulation of the immune system, the stress response, and mood.

Prolactin binds to receptors located on alveolar epithelial cells, stimulating the synthesis of the milk components including lactose, casein, and lipids. Lactose is the carbohydrate of milk, and casein is the protein of milk. While a mother is nursing and receiving nipple stimulation, prolactin levels spike and milk production occurs. “Prolactin levels fall to non-pregnant levels after 1 to 2 weeks” when the mother is no longer nursing the child. Prolactin, therefore, can be considered a short-term positive feedback mechanism, as high levels of prolactin stimulate more prolactin secretion from the prolactin cells of the pituitary gland.

During pregnancy, prolactin influences the body metabolically, increasing appetite, fat storage, and the transfer of glucose to the fetus. Prolactin regulates both bone and calcium homeostasis, acts to suppress ovulation, and stimulates secretion of oxytocin.

In addition to the pituitary gland, prolactin is produced by T cells, B cells (lymphocytes of the immune system), and macrophages. Within the immune system, prolactin acts to promote lymphocyte differentiation, proliferation, and function through the activation of protein kinase C signaling pathway. Prolactin has immunomodulatory and anti-inflammatory effects within the immune system, contributing to immune system maintenance.

Stress also acutely stimulates prolactin production, as dopamine (a prolactin inhibitor) levels are reduced under stress, the pituitary gland is in turn expressed more leading to higher prolactin levels.

== Regulation ==
Prolactin cell regulation mainly involves dopamine, a prolactin production suppressor, estrogen, a prolactin production stimulator, and thyrotropin-releasing hormone (TRH), a prolactin release stimulator.

Dopamine, the main inhibitor, keeps prolactin levels low. Dopamine is secreted by the hypothalamus during times of high prolactin levels, which in response lowers prolactin levels, a negative feedback mechanism. Estrogen, a stimulator, enhances the production of prolactin. During times of elevated estrogen levels, such as during pregnancy, prolactin production is increased. TRH stimulates the release of prolactin from the pituitary gland. TRH, also released by the hypothalamus, binds to receptors on prolactin cells, activating cellular signaling pathways that promote prolactin secretion.

== Clinical significance ==
Levels of the hormone prolactin within the body can indicate various conditions. Normal prolactin levels support reproductive and metabolic functions, while elevated prolactin levels (hyperprolactinemia), and low prolactin levels (hypoprolactinemia) can indicate an underlying medical disorder. Levels of prolactin within the body can also be affected by factors such as pregnancy, stress, and certain medications. Due to the widespread distribution of prolactin receptors across the body’s organs and tissues, elevated levels of prolactin can simultaneously influence multiple organ systems of the body.

While prolactin cell levels rise during pregnancy and lactation, they can also rise due to stress, pain, exercise, sexual intercourse, and food consumption. Hyperprolactinemia (elevated prolactin levels) can be caused by excessive thyrotropin-releasing hormone production or decreased dopamine levels. This may cause symptoms in both males and females such as infertility, erectile dysfunction, and irregular periods.

Excessive release of prolactin can be due to a prolactinoma, a tumor of the pituitary gland. The tumor itself may not cause symptoms, but may cause an increased production of prolactin and decreased levels of estrogen and testosterone. Symptoms due to a prolactinoma may include infertility, a decrease in sexual desire, and osteoporosis. In men, symptoms may include erectile dysfunction, enlarged breast tissue, and decreased body hair. In women, symptoms may include breast discharge, irregular menstrual cycles, acne, and increased body hair.

Prolactin tests measure the amount of prolactin within the blood. This test can also be used to assess the function of the pituitary gland. Dysregulation of the pituitary gland, such as due to hypopituitarism, can cause low levels of prolactin.

Normal levels of prolactin are typically lower for males in comparison to females, at 20ng/mL, compared to 25ng/mL. This level rises in women during pregnancy or breastfeeding to be between 80 and 400ng/mL.

Prolactin cells are classified as acidophils, staining pink/reddish due to acidic dyes such as eosin used with hematoxylin.

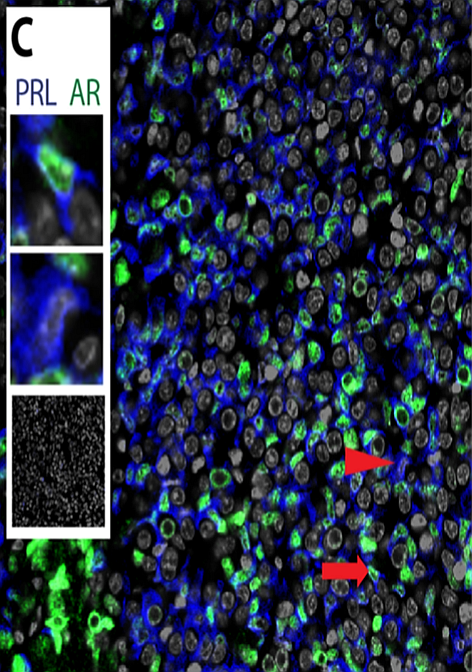
Lactotropic Cells (in blue)

== Evolution ==
While the hormone prolactin was discovered in 1928, the prolactin cell itself was not identified and characterized until the 1970s through the use of immunohistochemistry, a technique using antibodies to locate specific hormones within tissues. Prolactin, considered a phylogenetically old signaling molecule, can be traced back 500 million years to lampreys, a jawless vertebrate fish group.

The pituitary gland which prolactin cells develop from is itself unique to the vertebrate group. The emergence of the prolactin (PRL) gene in early vertebrate evolution allowed for prolactin cells to gain the regulatory and endocrine functions it maintains within the body. Over time, the role of prolactin within the body diversified as species diversified. In mammals and fish, lactation, mammary gland development, and osmoregulation are the most established functions of prolactin, whereas in birds, prolactin is important for regulating parental behavioral control.

The expansion of prolactin cell function over evolutionary history is responsible for the wide distribution of prolactin receptors (PRLRs) within the body, and the diverse physiological effects prolactin hormone has on multiple body systems.

== See also ==
- Hypothalamic–pituitary–prolactin axis
- List of distinct cell types in the adult human body
