= Prolactin =

Protein family and hormone

PRL
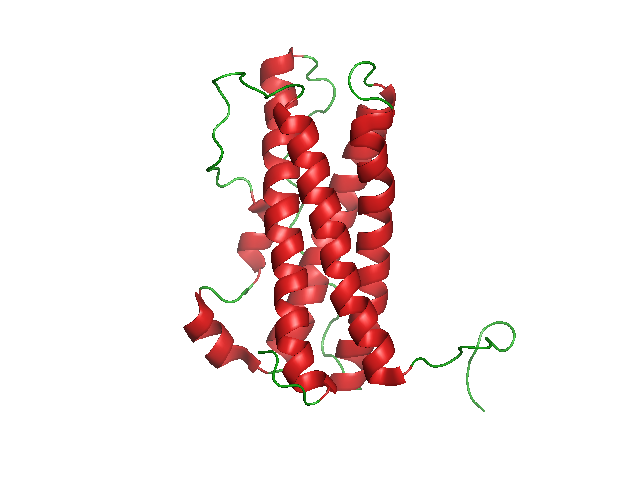

Identifiers
- Aliases: PRL, GHA1, prolactin
- External IDs: OMIM: 176760; MGI: 97762; GeneCards: PRL
Available structures
PDB	Ortholog search: PDBe RCSB
PDB	List of PDB id codes 1RW5, 2Q98, 3D48, 3EW3, 3MZG, 3N06, 3N0P, 3NCB, 3NCC, 3NCE, 3NCF, 3NPZ

Gene location (Human)
Chr.	Chromosome 6 (human)
Band	6p22.3	Start	22,287,244 bp
Band	6p22.3	End	22,302,826 bp

Gene location (Mouse)
Chr.	Chromosome 13 (mouse)
Band	13 A3.1|13 12.25 cM	Start	27,241,553 bp
Band	13 A3.1|13 12.25 cM	End	27,249,188 bp
RNA expression pattern
Bgee	Human / Mouse (ortholog); Top expressed in: pituitary gland; anterior pituitary; decidua; gonad; testicle; stromal cell of endometrium; right hemisphere of cerebellum; gastric mucosa; secondary oocyte; body of uterus / Top expressed in: pituitary gland; anterior pituitary; pars distalis of adenohypophysis; nucleus of stria terminalis; cingulate gyrus; central gray substance of midbrain; Epithelium of choroid plexus; superior frontal gyrus; sensory ganglion; cochlea; More reference expression data
BioGPS	n/a
Gene ontology
Molecular function	prolactin receptor binding; protein binding; hormone activity
Cellular component	extracellular region; endosome lumen; secretory granule; extracellular space
Biological process	female pregnancy; cell surface receptor signaling pathway; growth hormone receptor signaling pathway via JAK-STAT; lactation; cell population proliferation; positive regulation of receptor signaling pathway via JAK-STAT; regulation of multicellular organism growth; regulation of signaling receptor activity; negative regulation of endothelial cell proliferation; negative regulation of angiogenesis; positive regulation of pri-miRNA transcription by RNA polymerase II; birth; response to nutrient; circadian rhythm; positive regulation of cell population proliferation; response to organic cyclic compound; regulation of ossification; response to estradiol; response to lipopolysaccharide; cellular response to hormone stimulus; multicellular organismal response to stress; ovarian cycle; response to ethanol; positive regulation of epithelial cell proliferation; mammary gland development; response to nutrient levels; positive regulation of lactation
Sources:Amigo / QuickGO
Orthologs
Databases	NCBI: entry; OMA: entry
Species	Human	Mouse
Entrez	5617	19109
Ensembl	ENSG00000172179	ENSMUSG00000021342
UniProt	P01236	P06879
RefSeq (mRNA)	NM_000948; NM_001163558	NM_001163530; NM_011164
RefSeq (protein)	NP_000939; NP_001157030	NP_001157002; NP_035294
Location (UCSC)	Chr 6: 22.29 – 22.3 Mb	Chr 13: 27.24 – 27.25 Mb
PubMed search
- Wikidata
View/Edit Human	View/Edit Mouse

Prolactin (PRL), also known as lactotropin and mammotropin, is a protein best known for its role in enabling mammals to produce milk. It is influential in over 300 separate processes in various vertebrates, including humans. Prolactin is secreted from the pituitary gland and plays an essential role in metabolism, regulation of the immune system and pancreatic development.

Discovered in non-human animals around 1930 by Oscar Riddle and confirmed in humans in 1970 by Henry Friesen, prolactin is a peptide hormone, encoded by the PRL gene.

In mammals, prolactin is associated with milk production; in fish it is thought to be related to the control of water and salt balance. Prolactin also acts in a cytokine-like manner and as an important regulator of the immune system. It has important cell cycle-related functions as a growth-, differentiating- and anti-apoptotic factor. As a growth factor, binding to cytokine-like receptors, it influences hematopoiesis and angiogenesis and is involved in the regulation of blood clotting through several pathways. The hormone acts in endocrine, autocrine, and paracrine manners through the prolactin receptor and numerous cytokine receptors.

Pituitary prolactin secretion is regulated by endocrine neurons in the hypothalamus. The most important of these are the neurosecretory tuberoinfundibulum (TIDA) neurons of the arcuate nucleus that secrete dopamine (a.k.a. prolactin inhibitory hormone) to act on the D_{2} receptors of lactotrophs, causing inhibition of prolactin secretion. Thyrotropin-releasing hormone has a stimulatory effect on prolactin release, although prolactin is the only anterior pituitary hormone whose principal control is inhibitory.

Several variants and forms are known per species. Many fish have variants prolactin A and prolactin B. Most vertebrates, including humans, also have the closely related somatolactin. In humans, 14, 16, and 22 kDa variants exist.

== Function ==
=== In humans ===
Prolactin has a wide variety of effects. It stimulates the mammary glands to produce milk (lactation): increased serum concentrations of prolactin during pregnancy cause enlargement of the mammary glands and prepare for milk production, which normally starts when levels of progesterone fall by the end of pregnancy and a suckling stimulus is present. Prolactin plays an important role in maternal behavior.

It has been shown in rats and sheep that prolactin affects lipid synthesis differentially in mammary and adipose cells. Prolactin deficiency induced by bromocriptine increased lipogenesis and insulin responsiveness in adipocytes while decreasing them in the mammary gland.

In general, dopamine inhibits prolactin but this process has feedback mechanisms.

Elevated levels of prolactin decrease the levels of sex hormones—estrogen in women and testosterone in men. The effects of mildly elevated levels of prolactin are much more variable, in women, substantially increasing or decreasing estrogen levels.

Prolactin is sometimes classified as a gonadotropin although in humans it has only a weak luteotropic effect while the effect of suppressing classical gonadotropic hormones is more important. Prolactin within the normal reference ranges can act as a weak gonadotropin, but at the same time suppresses gonadotropin-releasing hormone secretion. The exact mechanism by which it inhibits gonadotropin-releasing hormone is poorly understood. Although expression of prolactin receptors have been demonstrated in rat hypothalamus, the same has not been observed in gonadotropin-releasing hormone neurons. Physiologic levels of prolactin in males enhance luteinizing hormone-receptors in Leydig cells, resulting in testosterone secretion, which leads to spermatogenesis.

Prolactin also stimulates proliferation of oligodendrocyte precursor cells. These cells differentiate into oligodendrocytes, the cells responsible for the formation of myelin coatings on axons in the central nervous system.

Other actions include contributing to pulmonary surfactant synthesis of the fetal lungs at the end of the pregnancy and immune tolerance of the fetus by the maternal organism during pregnancy. Prolactin promotes neurogenesis in maternal and fetal brains.

In music psychology, it is conjectured that prolactin may play a role in the pleasurable perception of sad music, as the levels of the hormone increase when a person feels sad, producing a consoling psychological effect.

Prolactin is released after orgasm, and may be linked with sexual satiety in that higher levels of prolactin are associated with greater sexual satisfaction. It was also suggested for some time that prolactin may be involved in the post-ejaculatory refractory period, however there is no evidence for this. Nonetheless, evidence exists to suggest that prolactin inhibits sexual drive.

=== In other vertebrates ===
The primary function of prolactin in fish is osmoregulation, i.e., controlling the movement of water and salts between the tissues of the fish and the surrounding water. Like mammals, however, prolactin in fish also has reproductive functions, including promoting sexual maturation and inducing breeding cycles, as well as brooding and parental care. In the South American discus, prolactin may also regulate the production of a skin secretion that provides food for larval fry. An increase in brooding behaviour caused by prolactin has been reported in hens.

Prolactin and its receptor are expressed in the skin, specifically in the hair follicles, where they regulate hair growth and moulting in an autocrine fashion. Elevated levels of prolactin can inhibit hair growth, and knock-out mutations in the prolactin gene cause increased hair length in cattle and mice. Conversely, mutations in the prolactin receptor can cause reduced hair growth, resulting in the "slick" phenotype in cattle. Additionally, prolactin delays hair regrowth in mice.

Analogous to its effects on hair growth and shedding in mammals, prolactin in birds controls the moulting of feathers, as well as the age at onset of feathering in both turkeys and chickens. Pigeons, flamingos and male emperor penguins feed their young a cheese-like secretion from the upper digestive tract called crop milk, whose production is regulated by prolactin.

In rodents, pseudopregnancy can occur when a female is mated with a sterile male. This mating can cause bi-daily surges of prolactin which would normally occur in rodent pregnancy. Prolactin surges initiate the secretion of progesterone which maintains pregnancy and hence can initiate pseudopregnancy. The false maintenance of pregnancy exhibits the outward physical symptoms of pregnancy, in the absence of a foetus.

Prolactin receptor activation is essential for normal mammary gland development during puberty in mice. Adult virgin female prolactin receptor knockout mice have much smaller and less developed mammary glands than their wild-type counterparts. Prolactin and prolactin receptor signaling are also essential for maturation of the mammary glands during pregnancy in mice.

== Regulation ==
In humans, prolactin is produced at least in the anterior pituitary, decidua, myometrium, breast, lymphocytes, leukocytes and prostate.

=== Pituitary ===
Pituitary prolactin is controlled by the Pit-1 transcription factor, which binds to the gene at several sites including a proximal promoter. This promoter is inhibited by dopamine and stimulated by estrogens, neuropeptides, and growth factors. Estrogens can also suppress dopamine.

Interaction with neuropeptides is still a matter of active research: no specific prolactin-releasing hormone has been identified. It is known that mice react to both VIP and TRH, but humans seem to only react to TRH. There are prolactin-releasing peptides that work in vitro, but whether they deserve their name has been questioned. Oxytocin does not play a large role. Mice without a posterior pituitary do not raise their prolactin levels even with suckling and oxytocin injection, but scientists have yet to identify which specific hormone produced by this region is responsible.

In birds (turkeys), VIP is a powerful prolactin-releasing factor, while peptide histidine isoleucine has almost no effect.

=== Extrapituitary ===
Extrapituitary prolactin is controlled by a superdistal promoter, located 5.8 kb upstream of the pituitary start site. The promoter does not react to dopamine, estrogens, or TRH. Instead, it is stimulated by cAMP. Responsiveness to cAMP is mediated by an imperfect cAMP–responsive element and two CAAT/enhancer binding proteins (C/EBP). Progesterone upregulates prolactin synthesis in the endometrium but decreases it in myometrium and breast glandular tissue.

Breast and other tissues may express the Pit-1 promoter in addition to the distal promoter. Oct-1 appears able to substitute for Pit-1 in activating the promoter in breast cancer cells.

Extrapituitary production of prolactin is thought to be special to humans and primates and may serve mostly tissue-specific paracrine and autocrine purposes. It has been hypothesized that in vertebrates such as mice a similar tissue-specific effect is achieved by a large family of prolactin-like proteins controlled by at least 26 paralogous PRL genes not present in primates.

=== Stimuli ===
Prolactin follows diurnal and ovulatory cycles. Prolactin levels peak during REM sleep and in the early morning. Many mammals experience a seasonal cycle.

During pregnancy, high circulating concentrations of estrogen and progesterone increase prolactin levels by 10- to 20-fold. Estrogen and progesterone inhibit the stimulatory effects of prolactin on milk production. The abrupt drop of estrogen and progesterone levels following delivery allow prolactin—which temporarily remains high—to induce lactation.

Sucking on the nipple offsets the fall in prolactin as the internal stimulus for them is removed. The sucking activates mechanoreceptors in and around the nipple. These signals are carried by nerve fibers through the spinal cord to the hypothalamus, where changes in the electrical activity of neurons that regulate the pituitary gland increase prolactin secretion. The suckling stimulus also triggers the release of oxytocin from the posterior pituitary gland, which triggers milk let-down: Prolactin controls milk production (lactogenesis) but not the milk-ejection reflex; the rise in prolactin fills the breast with milk in preparation for the next feed. The posterior pituitary produces a yet-unidentified hormone that causes prolactin production.

In usual circumstances, in the absence of galactorrhea, lactation ceases within one or two weeks following the end of breastfeeding.

Levels can rise after exercise, high-protein meals, minor surgical procedures, following epileptic seizures or due to physical or emotional stress. In a study on female volunteers under hypnosis, prolactin surges resulted from the evocation, with rage, of humiliating experiences, but not from the fantasy of nursing. Stress-induced PRL changes are not linked to the posterior pituitary in rodents.

Hypersecretion is more common than hyposecretion. Hyperprolactinemia is the most frequent abnormality of the anterior pituitary tumors, termed prolactinomas. Prolactinomas may disrupt the hypothalamic–pituitary–gonadal axis as prolactin tends to suppress the secretion of gonadotropin-releasing hormone from the hypothalamus and in turn decreases the secretion of follicle-stimulating hormone and luteinizing hormone from the anterior pituitary, therefore disrupting the ovulatory cycle. Such hormonal changes may manifest as amenorrhea and infertility in females as well as erectile dysfunction in males. Inappropriate lactation (galactorrhoea) is another important clinical sign of prolactinomas.

== Structure and isoforms ==
The structure of prolactin is similar to that of growth hormone and placental lactogen. The molecule is folded due to the activity of three disulfide bonds. Significant heterogeneity of the molecule has been described, thus bioassays and immunoassays can give different results due to differing glycosylation, phosphorylation and sulfation, as well as degradation. The non-glycosylated form of prolactin is the dominant form that is secreted by the pituitary gland.

The three different sizes of prolactin are:

- Little prolactin—the predominant form. It has a molecular weight of approximately 23-kDa. It is a single-chain polypeptide of 199 amino acids and is apparently the result of removal of some amino acids.
- Big prolactin—approximately 48 kDa. It may be the product of interaction of several prolactin molecules. It appears to have little, if any, biological activity.
- Macroprolactin—approximately 150 kDa. It appears to have a low biological activity.
- Other variants with the molecular masses of 14, 16, and 22 kDa.

The levels of larger ones are somewhat higher during the early postpartum period.

== Prolactin receptor ==
Prolactin receptors are present in the mammillary glands, ovaries, pituitary glands, heart, lung, thymus, spleen, liver, pancreas, kidney, adrenal gland, uterus, skeletal muscle, skin and areas of the central nervous system. When prolactin binds to the receptor, it causes it to dimerize with another prolactin receptor. This results in the activation of Janus kinase 2, a tyrosine kinase that initiates the JAK-STAT pathway. Activation also results in the activation of mitogen-activated protein kinases and Src kinase.

Human prolactin receptors are insensitive to mouse prolactin.

== Diagnostic use ==
Prolactin levels may be checked as part of a sex hormone workup, as elevated prolactin secretion can suppress the secretion of follicle stimulating hormone and gonadotropin-releasing hormone, leading to hypogonadism and sometimes causing erectile dysfunction.

Prolactin levels may be of some use in distinguishing epileptic seizures from psychogenic non-epileptic seizures. The serum prolactin level usually rises following an epileptic seizure.

== Units and unit conversions ==
The serum concentration of prolactin can be given in mass concentration (μg/L or ng/mL), molar concentration (nmol/L or pmol/L), or international units (typically mIU/L). The current IU is calibrated against the third International Standard for Prolactin, IS 84/500. Reference ampoules of IS 84/500 contain "approximately" 2.5 μg of lyophilized human prolactin and have been assigned an activity of 0.053 International Units by calibrating against the previous standard. Measurements can be converted into mass units using this ratio of grams to IUs to obtain an equivalent in relationship to the contents of IS 84/500; prolactin concentrations expressed in mIU/L can be converted to μg/L of IS 84/500 equivalent by dividing by 21.2. Previous standards had other ratios in relation to their potency on the assay measurement. For example, the previous IS (83/562) had a potency of 27.0 mIU per μg.

The first International Reference Preparation (or IRP) of human Prolactin for Immunoassay was established in 1978 (75/504 1st IRP for human prolactin) at a time when purified human prolactin was in short supply. Previous standards relied on prolactin from animal sources. Purified human prolactin was scarce, heterogeneous, unstable, and difficult to characterize. A preparation labeled 81/541 was distributed by the WHO Expert Committee on Biological Standardization without official status and given the assigned value of 50 mIU/ampoule based on an earlier collaborative study. It was determined that this preparation behaved anomalously in certain immunoassays and was not suitable as an IS.

Three different human pituitary extracts containing prolactin were subsequently obtained as candidates for an IS. These were distributed into ampoules coded 83/562, 83/573, and 84/500. Collaborative studies involving 20 different laboratories found little difference between these three preparations. 83/562 appeared to be the most stable. This preparation was largely free of dimers and polymers of prolactin. On the basis of these investigations, 83/562 was established as the Second IS for human prolactin. Once stocks of these ampoules were depleted, 84/500 was established as the Third IS for human prolactin.

84/500 has nearly run out and in 2016 replacement was proposed. The new 83/573 contains 67.2 mIU per ampoule when calibrated against the third IS and contains 1.002 g of human pituitary extract each (which is then lyophilized). Each ampoule contains approximately 3.2 μg of prolactin. The assigned value will be 67 mIU per ampoule. If a fifth IS is needed, it will likely be based on recombinant protein, as WHO has not received any further donations of human pituitary extracts.

== Reference ranges ==
General guidelines for diagnosing prolactin excess (hyperprolactinemia) define the upper threshold of normal prolactin at 25 μg/L for women and 20 μg/L for men. Similarly, guidelines for diagnosing prolactin deficiency (hypoprolactinemia) are defined as prolactin levels below 3 μg/L in women and 5 μg/L in men. However, different assays and methods for measuring prolactin are employed by different laboratories and as such the serum reference range for prolactin is often determined by the laboratory performing the measurement. Furthermore, prolactin levels vary according to factors as age, sex, menstrual cycle stage and pregnancy. The circumstances surrounding a given prolactin measurement (assay, patient condition, etc.) must therefore be considered before the measurement can be accurately interpreted.

The following chart illustrates the variations seen in normal prolactin measurements across different populations. Prolactin values were obtained from specific control groups of varying sizes using the IMMULITE assay.

Typical prolactin values
Proband	Prolactin, μg/L (ng/mL)
women, follicular phase (n = 803)	12.1
women, luteal phase (n = 699)	13.9
women, mid-cycle (n = 53)	17
women, whole cycle (n = 1555)	13.0
women, pregnant, 1st trimester (n = 39)	16
women, pregnant, 2nd trimester (n = 52)	49
women, pregnant, 3rd trimester (n = 54)	113
Men, 21–30 (n = 50)	9.2
Men, 31–40 (n = 50)	7.1
Men, 41–50 (n = 50)	7.0
Men, 51–60 (n = 50)	6.2
Men, 61–70 (n = 50)	6.9

=== Inter-method variability ===
The following table illustrates variability in reference ranges of serum prolactin between some commonly used assay methods (as of 2008), using a control group of healthy health care professionals (53 males, age 20–64 years, median 28 years; 97 females, age 19–59 years, median 29 years) in Essex, England:

Assay method	Mean Prolactin		Lower limit 2.5th percentile		Upper limit 97.5th percentile	
Assay method	mIU/L	μg/L	mIU/L	μg/L	mIU/L	μg/L
Females
Centaur	168	7.92	71	3.35	348	16.4
Immulite	196	9.25	75	3.54	396	18.7
Access	192	9.06	77	3.63	408	19.3
Elecsys	222	10.5	88	4.15	492	23.2
Architect	225	10.6	98	4.62	447	21.1
AIA (Note: Beltran 2008 Table 2 Archived 9 November 2011 at the Wayback Machine reports measurements in mIU/L. AIA machines are calibrated to read the correct amount of μg/L against the second international standard IS 83/562, which has a potency of 27.0 mIU per μg. By converting these measurements to mIU/L, Beltran makes measurements from machines calibrated against the second and third IS comparable, because the third IS is calibrated against the second to maintain the magnitude of the IU. However, the raw readout of the machine will still be in μg/L of IS-83/562-equivalent, unlike the other machines which report in μg/L of IS-84/500-equivalent.)	257	9.52	105	3.89	548	20.3
Males
Access	146	6.89	58	2.74	277	13.1
Centaur	167	7.88	63	2.97	262	12.4
Immulite	158	7.45	70	3.30	281	13.3
Elecsys	180	8.49	72	3.40	331	15.6
Architect	188	8.87	85	4.01	310	14.6
AIA	211	7.81	89	3.3	365	13.52

An example of the use of the above table is, if using the Centaur assay to estimate prolactin values in μg/L for females, the mean is 168 mIU/L (7.92 μg/L) and the reference range is 71–348 mIU/L (3.35–16.4 μg/L).

== Conditions ==
=== Elevated levels ===
Hyperprolactinaemia, or excess serum prolactin, is associated with hypoestrogenism, anovulatory infertility, oligomenorrhoea, amenorrhoea, unexpected lactation and loss of libido in women and erectile dysfunction and loss of libido in men.

Causes of Elevated Prolactin Levels

Physiological

- Coitus
- Exercise
- Lactation
- Pregnancy
- Sleep
- Stress
- Depression

Pharmacological

- Anesthetics
- Anticonvulsant
- Antihistamines (H2)
- Antihypertensives
- Cholinergic agonist
- Drug-induced hypersecretion
- Catecholamine depletor
- Dopamine receptor blockers
- Dopamine synthesis inhibitor
- Estrogens
  - Oral contraceptives
  - Oral contraceptive withdrawal
- Antipsychotics
- Neuropeptides
- Opioids and opioid receptor antagonists

Pathological

- Hypothalamic–pituitary stalk damage
  - Granulomas
  - Infiltrations
  - Radiation
  - Rathke's cyst
- Trauma
  - Pituitary stalk resection
  - Suprasellar surgery
- Tumors
  - Craniopharyngioma
  - Germinoma
  - Hypothalamic metastases
  - Meningioma
  - Suprasellar pituitary mass extension
- Surgery

- Pituitary
  - Acromegaly
  - Idiopathic
  - Lymphocytic hypophysitis or parasellar mass
  - Macroadenoma (compressive)
  - Macroprolactinemia
  - Plurihumoral adenoma
  - Prolactinoma
- Systemic disorders
  - Chest-neurologic chest wall trauma
  - Herpes Zoster
  - Chronic renal failure
  - Cirrhosis
  - Cranial radiation
  - Epileptic seizures
  - Polyendocrine metabolic ovarian syndrome
  - Pseudocyesis
  - Chronic low levels of thyroid hormone

=== Decreased levels ===
Hypoprolactinemia, or serum prolactin deficiency, is associated with ovarian dysfunction in women, and arteriogenic erectile dysfunction, premature ejaculation, oligozoospermia, asthenospermia, hypofunction of seminal vesicles and hypoandrogenism in men. In one study, normal sperm characteristics were restored when prolactin levels were raised to normal values in hypoprolactinemic men.

Hypoprolactinemia can result from hypopituitarism, excessive dopaminergic action in the tuberoinfundibular pathway and ingestion of D_{2} receptor agonists such as bromocriptine. Dextroamphetamine has been shown to reduce serum prolactin, presumably due to its dopaminergic effects, indirectly increasing activation of dopamine D_{2} receptors with data showing intravenous dextroamphetamine at doses between 7.5 mg to 15 mg reducing serum prolactin by 27-32% and 30-37%, respectively, while an oral dose of 20 mg led to a sustained 40% reduction of serum prolactin in postpartum women.

== In medicine ==
Prolactin is available commercially for use in other animals, but not in humans. It is used to stimulate lactation in animals. The biological half-life of prolactin in humans is around 15–20 minutes. The D_{2} receptor is involved in the regulation of prolactin secretion, and agonists of the receptor such as bromocriptine and cabergoline decrease prolactin levels while antagonists of the receptor such as domperidone, metoclopramide, haloperidol, risperidone, and sulpiride increase prolactin levels. D_{2} receptor antagonists like domperidone, metoclopramide, and sulpiride are used as galactogogues to increase prolactin secretion in the pituitary gland and induce lactation in humans.

== See also ==
- Breast-feeding
- Breastfeeding and fertility
- Epileptic seizure
- Hyperprolactinaemia
- Hypothalamic–pituitary–prolactin axis
- Male lactation
- Prolactin modulator
- Prolactin receptor
- Prolactin-releasing hormone
- Prolactinoma
- Weaning
