= Hypothalamic–pituitary–prolactin axis =

Hormone pathway

Hypothalamic–pituitary–prolactin (HPP) axis diagram

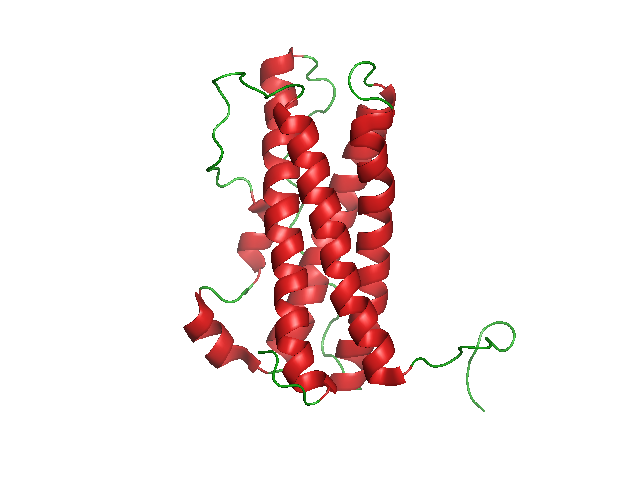
Prolactin, a major hormone of the HPP axis.

The hypothalamic–pituitary–prolactin axis (HPP axis), also known as the hypothalamic–pituitary–mammary axis or hypothalamic–pituitary–breast axis, is a hypothalamic–pituitary axis which includes the secretion of prolactin (PRL; luteotropin) from the lactotrophs of the pituitary gland into the circulation and the subsequent action of prolactin on tissues such as, particularly, the mammary glands or breasts. It is involved in lobuloalveolar maturation of the mammary glands during pregnancy and the induction and maintenance of lactation following parturition. Hormones that control the secretion of prolactin from the pituitary gland include dopamine ("prolactin-inhibiting factor", or "PIF"), estradiol, progesterone, thyrotropin-releasing hormone (TRH), and vasoactive intestinal peptide (VIP).

== Anatomy ==
=== Tuberoinfundibular dopaminergic neurons ===
The cell bodies of TIDA neurons are located in the arcuate nucleus (infundibular nucleus) of the mediobasal hypothalamus. Their axons project to the external zone of the median eminence, where dopamine is released into the fenestrated capillaries of the primary portal plexus. First identified by Kjell Fuxe in 1963–1964, TIDA neurons are distinguished from nigrostriatal and mesolimbic dopamine populations by their neuroendocrine function. TIDA neurons display intrinsic oscillatory activity and are regulated by gonadal steroids and by prolactin itself.

=== Lactotrophs ===
Lactotrophs (also called prolactin cells or mammotrophs) are acidophilic cells of the anterior pituitary that synthesise, store, and secrete prolactin. They develop from the Pit-1 (POU1F1)–dependent lineage, shared with somatotrophs and thyrotrophs. In the normal adult pituitary, lactotrophs constitute approximately 15–25% of anterior pituitary cells; this proportion rises to as high as 50% during pregnancy and lactation owing to estrogen-driven hyperplasia. Lactotrophs are electrically excitable, firing spontaneous action potentials accompanied by calcium transients that sustain continuous exocytosis.

=== Hypothalamic–hypophyseal portal system ===
Dopamine released at TIDA terminals enters the long portal veins and is delivered directly to lactotrophs of the anterior pituitary. An additional source of dopamine reaches the anterior lobe from the neurointermediate lobe via short portal vessels. Severing or compressing the pituitary stalk eliminates dopamine delivery and causes prolactin levels to rise sharply, an effect opposite to that seen with every other anterior pituitary hormone.

== Regulation of prolactin secretion ==
Because lactotrophs are constitutively active, prolactin secretion operates through a "release from inhibition" model. Several inhibitory and stimulatory factors modulate the system.

=== Inhibitory factors ===
==== Dopamine ====
Dopamine is the principal prolactin-inhibiting factor. It acts on D_{2} receptors (D_{2}R) on the lactotroph membrane. Two D_{2}R isoforms (D_{2L} and D_{2S}) couple to G_{i}/G_{o} proteins and produce inhibition through multiple time-dependent mechanisms:

- Within seconds, D_{2}R activation opens inwardly rectifying K^{+} channels, hyperpolarising the membrane and preventing voltage-gated Ca^{2+} influx, which halts exocytosis.
- Over minutes to hours, D_{2}R suppresses adenylyl cyclase, lowering cAMP and reducing prolactin gene transcription.
- Chronically, D_{2}R activates phosphotyrosine phosphatases and modulates ERK/MAPK pathways, inhibiting lactotroph proliferation.

D_{2}R-knockout mice develop lactotroph hyperplasia and frank prolactinomas, confirming the essential anti-proliferative role of dopaminergic signalling.

==== Somatostatin ====
Somatostatin acts as a secondary inhibitor of prolactin release, counteracting TRH- and VIP-stimulated secretion.

==== GnRH-associated peptide ====
GnRH-associated peptide (GAP), a 56-amino-acid peptide cleaved from the GnRH precursor, was shown in 1985 to inhibit prolactin secretion in rat pituitary cultures at a potency comparable to dopamine. Its physiological significance in vivo remains uncertain, as results have varied across species.

=== Stimulatory factors ===
No single dominant prolactin-releasing hormone has been identified, which reinforces the primacy of inhibitory control in this axis.

==== Thyrotropin-releasing hormone ====
Thyrotropin-releasing hormone (TRH) is a potent stimulator of prolactin release, acting via phospholipase C to mobilise intracellular calcium and activate protein kinase C. In primary hypothyroidism, elevated TRH stimulates both TSH and prolactin, producing hyperprolactinaemia in approximately 20–40% of hypothyroid patients. However, TRH-knockout mice display normal prolactin levels, indicating that TRH is a modulator rather than an obligate releasing factor.

==== Vasoactive intestinal peptide ====
Vasoactive intestinal peptide (VIP) stimulates prolactin release via G_{s}-coupled receptors, increasing cAMP and activating protein kinase A. VIP-containing neurons are located in the paraventricular nucleus.

==== Estrogen ====
Estrogens act through ERα to stimulate prolactin gene transcription directly and to promote lactotroph proliferation. ERα-knockout mice show a 10–20-fold reduction in prolactin mRNA. During pregnancy, rising estrogen levels contribute to the physiological expansion of the lactotroph population.

==== Other factors ====
Oxytocin reaches lactotrophs via portal vessels and fulfils the criteria of a prolactin-releasing factor during suckling. Serotonin mediates the nocturnal prolactin surge and suckling-induced prolactin release via 5-HT_{1A} and 5-HT_{2} receptors. Other reported stimulatory factors include neurotensin, angiotensin II, and galanin. Prolactin-releasing peptide (PrRP), despite its name, does not appear to function as a classical hypophysiotropic releasing factor in vivo.

=== Short-loop feedback ===
Prolactin itself provides negative short-loop feedback by acting on long-form prolactin receptors (PRLR) expressed on TIDA neurons, activating the JAK2–STAT5B signalling cascade. This feedback has two temporal components. Within minutes, prolactin switches TIDA neurons from phasic to tonic firing, increasing dopamine release into the portal vasculature. Over 12–16 hours, prolactin increases tyrosine hydroxylase expression and activity, elevating dopamine synthesis. In PRLR-knockout mice, dopaminergic input to the pituitary is markedly reduced despite severe hyperprolactinaemia, confirming that TIDA tone depends on prolactin feedback.

== Physiological functions ==
=== Lactation ===
Prolactin is the primary lactogenic hormone. It drives mammary gland development (mammogenesis), milk synthesis (lactogenesis), and maintenance of milk production. PRLR-knockout mice show absent mammary development. During pregnancy, high estrogen and progesterone promote ductal and lobuloalveolar growth but suppress milk secretion; withdrawal of these steroids at parturition permits prolactin-driven lactogenesis. Suckling activates a neuroendocrine reflex: afferent signals from mechanoreceptors inhibit TIDA dopamine release (raising prolactin) while simultaneously triggering oxytocin release for the milk ejection reflex.

=== Reproduction ===
Hyperprolactinaemia suppresses the reproductive axis by inhibiting pulsatile GnRH secretion. This operates through kisspeptin neurons: prolactin acts on PRLR expressed on arcuate nucleus KNDy neurons (kisspeptin/neurokinin B/dynorphin), suppressing kisspeptin release and thereby silencing the GnRH pulse generator. This mechanism underlies lactational amenorrhoea: elevated prolactin during breastfeeding physiologically inhibits ovulation.

=== Immune modulation ===
Prolactin receptors are expressed on monocytes, macrophages, T cells, B cells, and natural killer cells. Prolactin promotes T-cell activation, stimulates immunoglobulin production, and counterbalances glucocorticoid-induced immunosuppression. However, PRL- and PRLR-deficient mice have surprisingly normal baseline immune profiles, suggesting that prolactin's immunomodulatory role is most important under stress or pathological conditions.

=== Osmoregulation ===
In teleost fish, prolactin is the principal freshwater-adapting hormone, preventing ion loss by stimulating ionocyte differentiation in gill epithelia. This is an ancient function of prolactin, conserved across vertebrate evolution. In mammals, the osmoregulatory role is less prominent but includes effects on amniotic fluid regulation and renal sodium handling.

== See also ==
- Prolactin modulator
- Hyperprolactinemia
- Hypoprolactinemia
- Hypothalamic–pituitary–adrenal axis
- Hypothalamic–pituitary–gonadal axis
- Hypothalamic–pituitary–thyroid axis
