= Galactorrhea =

Spontaneous flow of milk from the breast

- Specialty: Obstetrics

Galactorrhea (also spelled galactorrhoea) (galacto- + -rrhea) or lactorrhea (lacto- + -rrhea) is the spontaneous flow of milk from the breast, unassociated with childbirth or nursing.

Galactorrhea is reported to occur in 5–32% of females. Much of the difference in reported incidence can be attributed to different definitions of galactorrhea. Although frequently benign, it may be caused by serious underlying conditions and should be properly investigated. Galactorrhea also occurs in males, newborn infants and adolescents of both sexes.

== Causes ==
Galactorrhea can take place as a result of dysregulation of certain hormones. Hormonal causes most frequently associated with galactorrhea are hyperprolactinemia and thyroid conditions with elevated levels (Note: which may also suggest Pituitary disease) of thyroid-stimulating hormone (TSH) or thyrotropin-releasing hormone (TRH). No obvious cause is found in about 50% of cases.

Lactation requires the presence of prolactin, and the evaluation of galactorrhea includes eliciting a history for various medications or foods (methyldopa, opioids, antipsychotics, serotonin reuptake inhibitors) and for behavioral causes (stress, breast, and chest wall stimulation), as well as evaluation for gestation, pituitary adenomas (with overproduction of prolactin or compression of the pituitary stalk), and hypothyroidism. Adenomas of the anterior pituitary are most often prolactinomas. Overproduction of prolactin leads to cessation of menstrual periods and infertility, which may be a diagnostic clue. Galactorrhea may also be caused by hormonal imbalances owing to birth control pills.

Galactorrhea is also a side effect associated with the use of the second-generation H_{2} receptor antagonist cimetidine (Tagamet). Galactorrhea can also be caused by antipsychotics that cause hyperprolactinemia by blocking dopamine receptors responsible for control of prolactin release. Of these, risperidone is the most notorious for causing this complication. Case reports suggest proton-pump inhibitors have been shown to cause galactorrhea as a rare and atypical adverse effect.

== Neonatal milk ==
Neonatal milk or witch's milk is milk secreted from the breasts of approximately 5% of newborn infants. It is considered a normal variation and no treatment or testing is necessary. In folklore, witch's milk was believed to be a source of nourishment for witches' familiar spirits.

== See also ==
- Galactagogue
- Hypothalamic–pituitary–prolactin axis
- Lactation failure (disambiguation)
- Mammoplasia
