= Pituitary disease =

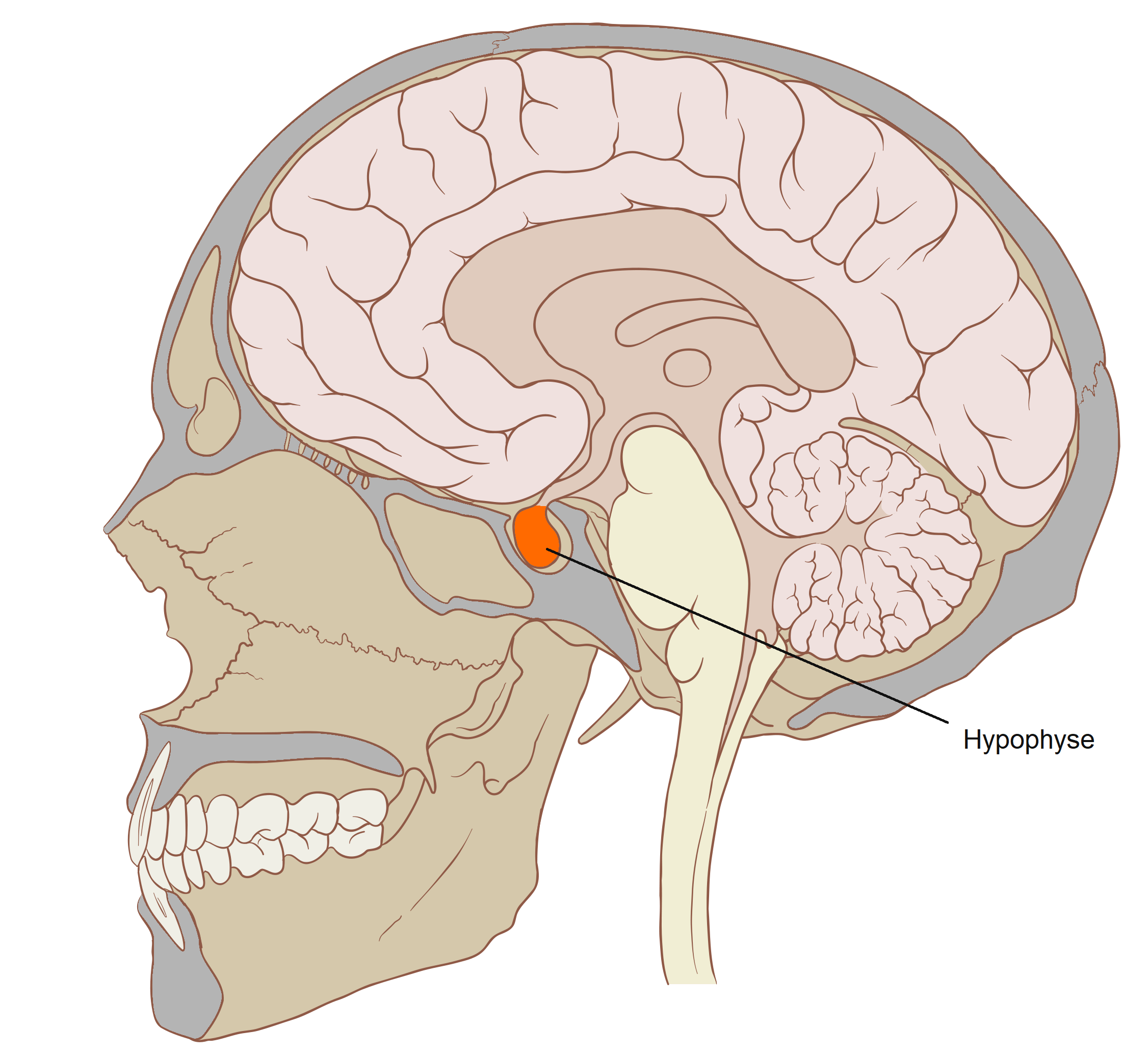
- Pituitary
- Specialty: Endocrinology

A pituitary disease is a disorder primarily affecting the pituitary gland.

== Table ==
The main disorders involving the pituitary gland are:

| Condition | Direction | Hormone |
|---|---|---|
| Acromegaly | overproduction | growth hormone |
| Gigantism | overproduction | growth hormone |
| Cushing's disease | overproduction | adrenocorticotropic hormone |
| Growth hormone deficiency | underproduction | growth hormone |
| Syndrome of inappropriate antidiuretic hormone | overproduction | vasopressin |
| Diabetes insipidus (can also be nephrogenic) | underproduction | vasopressin |
| Sheehan syndrome | underproduction | any pituitary hormone |
| Pickardt-Fahlbusch Syndrome | underproduction | any pituitary hormone, except prolactin, which is increased |
| Hyperpituitarism (most commonly pituitary adenoma) | overproduction | any pituitary hormone |
| Hypopituitarism | underproduction | any pituitary hormone |

Overproduction or underproduction of a pituitary hormone will affect the respective end-organ. For example, insufficient production (hyposecretion) of thyroid stimulating hormone (TSH) in the pituitary gland will cause hypothyroidism, while overproduction (hypersecretion) of TSH will cause hyperthyroidism. Thyroidisms caused by the pituitary gland are less common though, accounting for less than 10% of all hypothyroidism cases and much less than 1% of hyperthyroidism cases.

== See also ==
- Hypophysitis, inflammation of the pituitary gland.
- Autoimmune hypophysitis (or lymphocytic hypophysitis), inflammation of the pituitary gland due to autoimmunity.
- Nelson's syndrome, may occur after surgical removal of both adrenal glands, an out-dated method of treating Cushing's disease.
- Pituitary tumour, a tumor of the pituitary gland.
- Pituitary adenoma, a noncancerous tumor of the pituitary gland.
- Pituicytoma, a rare brain tumor.
- Pituitary apoplexy, bleeding into or impaired blood supply of the pituitary gland.
