= Pituicyte =

Glial cell of the pituitary gland

Details
- Location: Posterior pituitary
- Function: Glial cell

Identifiers
- Latin: pituicytus
- NeuroLex ID: sao1004082033
- TH: H3.08.02.2.00040
- FMA: 83503

Pituicytes are glial cells of the posterior pituitary. Their main role is to assist in the storage and release of neurohypophysial hormones.

== Structure ==
Pituicytes are located in the pars nervosa of the posterior pituitary and interspersed with unmyelinated axons and Herring bodies. They generally stain dark purple with an H&E stain and are among the easiest structures to identify in the region. Pituicytes have an irregular and branched shape which resembles that of another type of glial cell: the astrocyte. Like astrocytes, their cytoplasm presents specific intermediate filaments made up of glial fibrillary acidic protein (GFAP).

== Function ==
Pituicytes are similar to astrocytes, another type of glial cell. Their main role is to assist in the storage and release of hormones of the posterior pituitary. Pituicytes surround axonal endings and regulate hormone secretion by releasing their processes from these endings.

== Clinical significance ==
Pituicytomas are rare tumors that arise from pituicytes. They may be mistaken for the much more common pituitary adenoma, as well as craniopharyngioma and meningioma. Symptoms from the mass effect of the tumor usually include vision disorders, and less often headaches, hypopituitarism (decreased function of the pituitary gland), fatigue, and decreased libido.

== See also ==
List of distinct cell types in the adult human body
