= Hypophysitis =

Inflammation of the pituitary gland

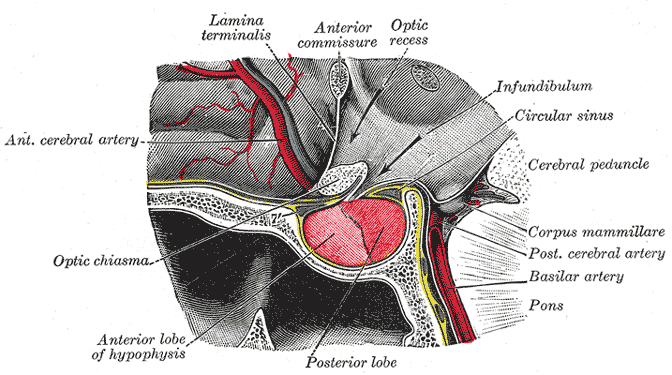
- Pituitary gland is located at the base of the human brain.
- Specialty: Endocrinology

Hypophysitis refers to an inflammation of the pituitary gland. Hypophysitis is rare and not fully understood.

== Signs and symptoms ==
There are four categories of symptoms and signs. Most commonly, the initial symptoms are headaches and visual disturbances. Some symptoms are derived from the lesser functioning of the adenohypophyseal hormones. Of the adenohypophyseal hormones, the most frequently affected are corticotropes, lactotropes and gonadotropes, all which are found in the anterior pituitary. Polyuria is also a common symptom – which results in very dilute urine, as well as polydipsia which means having extreme thirst. Another symptom is hyperprolactinemia, which is when there are abnormally high prolactin levels in the blood. Usually, a mass will be found located on the sella turcica and loss of hormonal function.

== Cause ==
Hypophysitis may have an underlying autoimmune aetiology, as in the case of autoimmune hypophysitis, and lymphocytic hypophysitis.

== Diagnosis ==
Mainly, the diagnosis of hypophysitis is through exclusion – patients often undergo surgery because they are suspected of having a pituitary adenoma. But, the most accurate diagnosis is using Magnetic Resonance Imaging (MRI) to find any mass or lesions on the sella turcica. It is a known side-effect of the new immune checkpoint inhibitors of the CTLA-4 inhibitor and PD-L1 inhibitor classes, used for the treatment of melanoma, and should be considered in patients on these drugs who present with endocrine dysfunction.

== Treatment ==
It was shown through various testing that administration of bromocriptine can improve field of vision defects and lower prolactin levels. It was also found that when using corticosteroids, there was a decrease in size of the gland, and relieved compression on the dura mater. These corticosteroids were also found to have an immunosuppressive effect which helped with reducing the autoimmune reaction of the gland.

== Prognosis ==
The prognosis for hypophysitis was variable for each individual. The depending factors for hypophysitis included the advancement of the mass on the sella turcica, percentage of fibrosis, and the body's response to corticosteroids. Through the use of corticosteroids, the vision defects tend to recover when the gland size began to decrease. The prognoses of the limited number of reported cases were usually good.

== History ==
The first reported case was in 1962, with a 22-year-old who died of adrenal insufficiency 14 months after giving birth to her second child. Her symptoms began 3 months postpartum, with lassitude (weakness/lack of energy), goitre (iodine deficiency) and amenorrhea (absence of a menstrual period). This was originally reported by Goudie and Pinkerton in Glasgow, UK. There have only been approximately just over 100 cases reported. Majority of these cases were female, and usually began noticing symptoms late into their pregnancies and in early postpartum.

== See also ==
- Autoimmune hypophysitis
- Lymphocytic hypophysitis
- Pituitary disease
- Hypopituitarism
