= Morris Simmonds =

German physician and pathologist (1855–1925)

Morris Simmonds (14 January 1855, St. Thomas – 4 September 1925, Hamburg) was a German physician and pathologist. He was born in St. Thomas, then part of the Danish West Indies (now the United States Virgin Islands). In 1861 he emigrated with his family to Hamburg, which was then an independent city.

In 1879 he received his doctorate from the University of Kiel, where he worked as an assistant to Arnold Ludwig Gotthilf Heller and Friedrich von Esmarch. In 1889 he began work as a prosector at St. Georg Hospital in Hamburg and in 1909 attained the title of professor. In 1919 he was named an honorary professor at the newly established University of Hamburg.

His special field of interest was the endocrine glands. His name is associated with "Simmonds' disease", defined as a form of hypopituitarism in which all pituitary secretions are lacking. In 1914 he was the first to describe the diseases' clinical features that were associated with destruction of the anterior lobe.

== Selected works ==
- Die ätiologische Bedeutung des Typhus-Bacillus. Untersuchungen aus dem allgemeinen Krankenhause zu Hamburg (with Eugen Fraenkel), Hamburg 1886 – The etiological significance of typhoid bacillus.
- Über Form und Lage des Magens unter normalen und abnormen Bedingungen. Jena, 1907.
- Ueber Hypophysisschwund mit tödlichem Ausgang. In: Deutsche Medizinische Wochenschrift, vol. 40, No. 7 [= 12 February 1914], Berlin 1914, pp. 322–323.
