= Harold Leeming Sheehan =

British physician and pathologist

- Born: 4 August 1900; Carlisle, Cumberland
- Died: 25 October 1988 (aged 88)
- Education: University of Manchester
- Occupations: Physician and professor of pathology
- Known for: Sheehan's syndrome

Harold Leeming Sheehan (1900–1988) was a British physician, pathologist, and professor of pathology.

== Biography ==
Harold Sheehan, whose father was a general practitioner, was the second of thirteen children (6 males and 7 females). After education at Carlisle Grammar School, Harold Sheehan studied medicine at the University of Manchester, graduating MB ChB in 1921. Harold Sheehan began his practice of medicine by joining his elder brother Gerald, who had taken over their father's practice upon the latter's death. Harold Sheehan worked as a general practitioner from 1921 to 1927.

He became in 1927 a demonstrator, and later a lecturer, in the University of Manchester's department of pathology. There the professor of pathology was John Shaw Dunn, who supervised Sheehan's MD thesis (1931) on the deposition of dyes in the mammalian kidney. In 1932 Sheehan graduated MSc with a thesis on renal elimination of injected urea and creatine. By means of a Rockefeller medical fellowship for the academic year 1934–1935, he studied renal function at the Johns Hopkins Medical School's department of pathology.

In 1935 he was appointed director of research at the Glasgow Royal Maternity Hospital and lecturer on pathology. In the years preceding WWII he became an internationally recognised expert on diseases of pregnancy.

He analysed the effects of obstetrical shock, he differentiated between the fatty liver of delayed chloroform poisoning and the condition of primary fatty liver of pregnancy, he demonstrated the reactivation of latent rheumatic heart disease that was induced by pregnancy, he clarified the effects of eclampsia upon the liver and kidneys, he identified the encephalopathy of hyperemesis gravidarum as Wernicke's disease, he recognized the association between concealed accidental haemorrhage and renal cortical necrosis and recognized that obstetrical shock and haemorrhage could induce necrosis of the anterior lobe of the pituitary gland.

He joined the Territorial Army in 1939 and became deputy director of pathology at the allied forces' headquarters in Italy. He was mentioned in dispatches and attained the rank of colonel in the RAMC.

... he helped to show that the sporadic jaundice seen in soldiers treated with intravenous arsenicals was caused by dirty syringes and needles infected with what we now know as hepatitis B virus.

He gained a DSc in 1940 and qualified MRCP in 1941. He was appointed in 1946 to the University of Liverpool's chair of pathology and built up a prestigious department. He acted as a histopathological consultant for the region surrounding Merseyside and monitored obstetrical deaths in the region, promptly performing many autopsies himself.

In 1949, with Victor Kirwan Summers he published an important paper on the syndrome of hypopituitarism.

The paper showed convincingly that emaciation and premature senility, previously considered to be essential for the diagnosis of pituitary insufficiency, were not features of the syndrome. This paper, rather than Sheehan's earlier papers on pituitary necrosis, led to the syndrome of post-partum pituitary necrosis becoming known as Sheehan's syndrome.

Sheehan was the president of the section of endocrinology at the October 1960 meeting of the Royal Society of Medicine and gave an address Atypical Hypopituitarism. He retired from the chair of pathology in 1965. From 1965 to 1980 in a room set aside for him at the Liverpool School of Tropical Medicine he studied his case notes and thousands of histopathological specimens accumulated over many years.

He was elected FRCP in 1947, FRCOG in 1949, and FRCPath in 1964. He went on a number of international lecture tours, always accompanied by his wife, who spoke several languages. He was elected a foreign correspondent of the Académie Nationale de Médecine.

In 1934 in Kensington, London, he married Eve Suzette Gertrude Potter (1905–1986). They had no children. Both of them were buried at Allerton Cemetery.

== Selected publications ==
=== Articles ===
- Sheehan, H. L. (26 June 1931). "The deposition of dyes in the mammalian kidney". J Physiol. 72 (2): 201–246. doi:10.1113/jphysiol.1931.sp002772. PMC 1403073. PMID 16994207.
- with J. S. Dunn and W. W. Kay: Dunn, J. S.; Kay, W. W.; Sheehan, H. L. (17 December 1931). "The elimination of urea by the mammalian kidney". J Physiol. 73 (4): 371–381. doi:10.1113/jphysiol.1931.sp002819. PMC 1394391. PMID 16994250.
- Sheehan, H. L. (8 February 1932). "The renal circulation rate in the rabbit". J Physiol. 74 (2): 214–220. doi:10.1113/jphysiol.1932.sp002842. PMC 1394446. PMID 16994272.
- with W. W. Kay: Kay, W. W.; Sheehan, H. L. (25 October 1933). "The renal elimination of injected urea and creatinine". J Physiol. 79 (4): 359–415. doi:10.1113/jphysiol.1933.sp003054. PMC 1394845. PMID 16994467.
- with H. Southworth: Sheehan, H. L.; Southworth, H. (12 November 1934). "The renal elimination of phenol red". J Physiol. 82 (4): 438–458. doi:10.1113/jphysiol.1934.sp003196. PMC 1394284. PMID 16994600.
- with William Whittle Kay: Kay, W. W.; Sheehan, H. L. (1934). "Accuracy in the determination of blood-urea by the urease aeration-titration method". Biochem J. 28 (5): 1784–1794. doi:10.1042/bj0281784. PMC 1253400. PMID 16745575.
- with W. W. Kay: Kay, W. W.; Sheehan, H. L. (1934). "The preparation, storage and use of standard carbonate-free sodium hydroxide solutions". Biochem J. 28 (5): 1795–1797. doi:10.1042/bj0281795. PMC 1253401. PMID 16745576.
- Sheehan, H. L. (19 August 1936). "The renal elimination of phenol red in the dog". J Physiol. 87 (3): 237–253. doi:10.1113/jphysiol.1936.sp003403. PMC 1395250. PMID 16994791.
- with Albert Sharman: Sharman, A.; Sheehan, H. L. (8 May 1937). "Endometrial Biopsy". Br Med J. 1 (3983): 965–966, 982–1. doi:10.1136/bmj.1.3983.965. PMC 2092669. PMID 20780651; Correction in: Br Med J. 1937 May 22; 1(3985): 1102
- Sheehan, H. L. (1938). "Post-Partum Necrosis of the Anterior Pituitary". Trans Edinb Obstet Soc. 58: 13–28. PMC 5422597. PMID 29612345.
- with A. M. Sutherland: Sheehan, H. L.; Sutherland, A. M. (October 1939). "Sex and age factors in acute and chronic valvular disease". Br Heart J. 1 (4): 303–324. doi:10.1136/hrt.1.4.303. PMC 503413. PMID 18609827.
- with J. Purdon Martin: Martin, J. P.; Sheehan, H. L. (8 March 1941). "Primary Thrombosis of Cerebral Veins (following Childbirth)". Br Med J. 1 (4183): 349–353. doi:10.1136/bmj.1.4183.349. PMC 2161360. PMID 20783556.
- with J. Purdon Martin: Martin, J. P.; Sheehan, H. L. (25 April 1942). "Puerperal Cerebral Thrombosis". Br Med J. 1 (4242): 538–539. doi:10.1136/bmj.1.4242.538-c. PMC 2160704.
- with James H. Hutchison, J. S. Pippard, and M. H. Gleeson-White: Hutchison, J. H.; Pippard, J. S.; Gleeson-White, M. H.; Sheehan, H. L. (19 January 1946). "Outbreak of Weil's Disease in the British Army in Italy". Br Med J. 1 (4437): 81–83. doi:10.1136/bmj.1.4437.81. PMC 2057907. PMID 20786511.
- with Ninian M. Falkiner: Sheehan, H. L.; Falkiner, N. M. (25 December 1948). "Splenic Aneurysm and Splenic Enlargement in Pregnancy". Br Med J. 2 (4590): 1105–1106. doi:10.1136/bmj.2.4590.1105. PMC 2092335. PMID 18103296.
- Sheehan, H. L. (14 May 1949). "Retained Placenta and Post-Partum Haemorrhage". Br Med J. 1 (4610): 849–851. doi:10.1136/bmj.1.4610.849. PMC 2050057. PMID 18128805.
- with R. T. Cooke: Cooke, R. T.; Sheehan, H. L. (22 April 1950). "Cases of Hypopituitarism". Br Med J. 1 (4659): 928–931. doi:10.1136/bmj.1.4659.928. PMC 2037569. PMID 15414316.
- with V. K. Summers: Summers, V. K.; Sheehan, H. L. (8 September 1951). "Cortisone and A.C.T.H. in Hypopituitarism". Br Med J. 2 (4731): 564–568. doi:10.1136/bmj.2.4731.564. PMC 2070056. PMID 14869647.
- with V. K. Summers: Sheehan, H. L.; Summers, V. K. (7 June 1952). "Treatment of Hypopituitary Coma". Br Med J. 1 (4770): 1214–1215. doi:10.1136/bmj.1.4770.1214. PMC 2023614. PMID 14925426.
- with V. K. Summers: Sheehan, H. L.; Summers, V. K. (27 March 1954). "Oral Cortisone Treatment of Hypopituitarism". Br Med J. 1 (4864): 723–726. doi:10.1136/bmj.1.4864.723. PMC 2084890. PMID 13140848.
- Sheehan, H. L. (22 October 1955). "Coma in Hypopituitarism". Br Med J. 2 (4946): 1022–1024. doi:10.1136/bmj.2.4946.1022. PMC 1981156. PMID 13260654.
- with J. C. Davis: Sheehan, H. L.; Davis, J. C. (October 1959). "Anatomy of the pelvis in the rabbit kidney". J Anat. 93(Pt 4) (Pt 4): 499–502.1. PMC 1244543. PMID 14445711.
- Sheehan, H. L. (January 1961). "Atypical Hypopituitarism". Proc R Soc Med. 54 (1): 43–48. doi:10.1177/003591576105400111. PMC 1869477. PMID 19994084.

=== Books ===
- with H. C. Moore: Renal cortical necrosis. Oxford: Blackwell Scientific. 1952.
- with J. B. Lynch: The pathology of toxaemia of pregnancy. Edinburgh: Churchill Livingstone. 1973.
- with J. C. Davis: Post-partum hypopituitarism. Springfield, Illinois: C. C. Thomas. 1982.
