= Pickardt syndrome =

Rare form of tertiary hypothyroidism

Pickardt–Fahlbusch syndrome
- Other names: Pickardt's syndrome or Pickardt–Fahlbusch syndrome
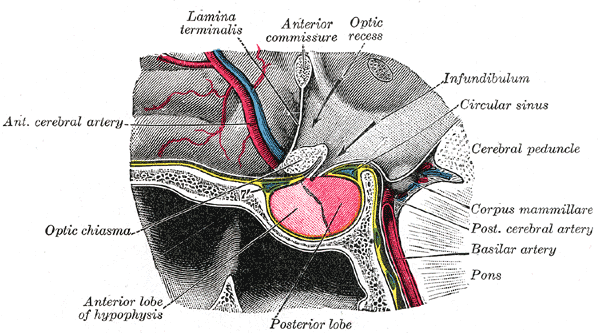
- An interupption of the hypophyseal portal system causes Pickardt's syndrome
- Specialty: Endocrinology
- Named after: Renate Pickardt; Rudolf Fahlbusch

Pickardt syndrome denotes a rare form of tertiary hypothyroidism that is caused by interruption of the portal veins connecting hypothalamus and pituitary.It was characterized in 1972 and 1973 by Renate Pickardt and Rudolf Fahlbusch.

== Cause ==
Interruption of the portal system may be caused by tumors compressing the infundibulum. Other causes for Pickardt's syndrome are inflammatory disorders and traumatic brain injury. An inborn variant of Pickardt's syndrome that is associated with certain mutations (HESX1 or LHX4) is referred to as pituitary stalk interruption syndrome (PSIS).

=== Endocrine consequences ===
Typical manifestations of Pickardt–Fahlbusch syndrome are hypothyroidism with reduced TSH values and functional hyperprolactinemia (which is caused by disinhibition of prolactin release). Other endocrine disorders that are usually associated with Pickardt syndrome are suprasellar failures like secondary hypogonadism, reduced levels of growth hormone and, in more severe cases, secondary adrenal insufficiency.

== Diagnosis ==
Pickardt's syndrome may cause difficulties in differential diagnosis of pituitary adenomas, as both suprasellar hormone-inactive adenomas and prolactinomas may be associated with increased prolactin levels, central hypogonadism and central hypothyroidism. Usually, the prolactin levels are higher in case of a true prolactinoma, but the concentration ranges overlap.

== Treatment ==
Treatment modality depends on the cause. Tumors may be removed surgically, but pituitary stalk interruption may persist. Usually, replacement of those hormones that are reduced due to failed feedback control systems will be necessary.
