= Pituicytoma =

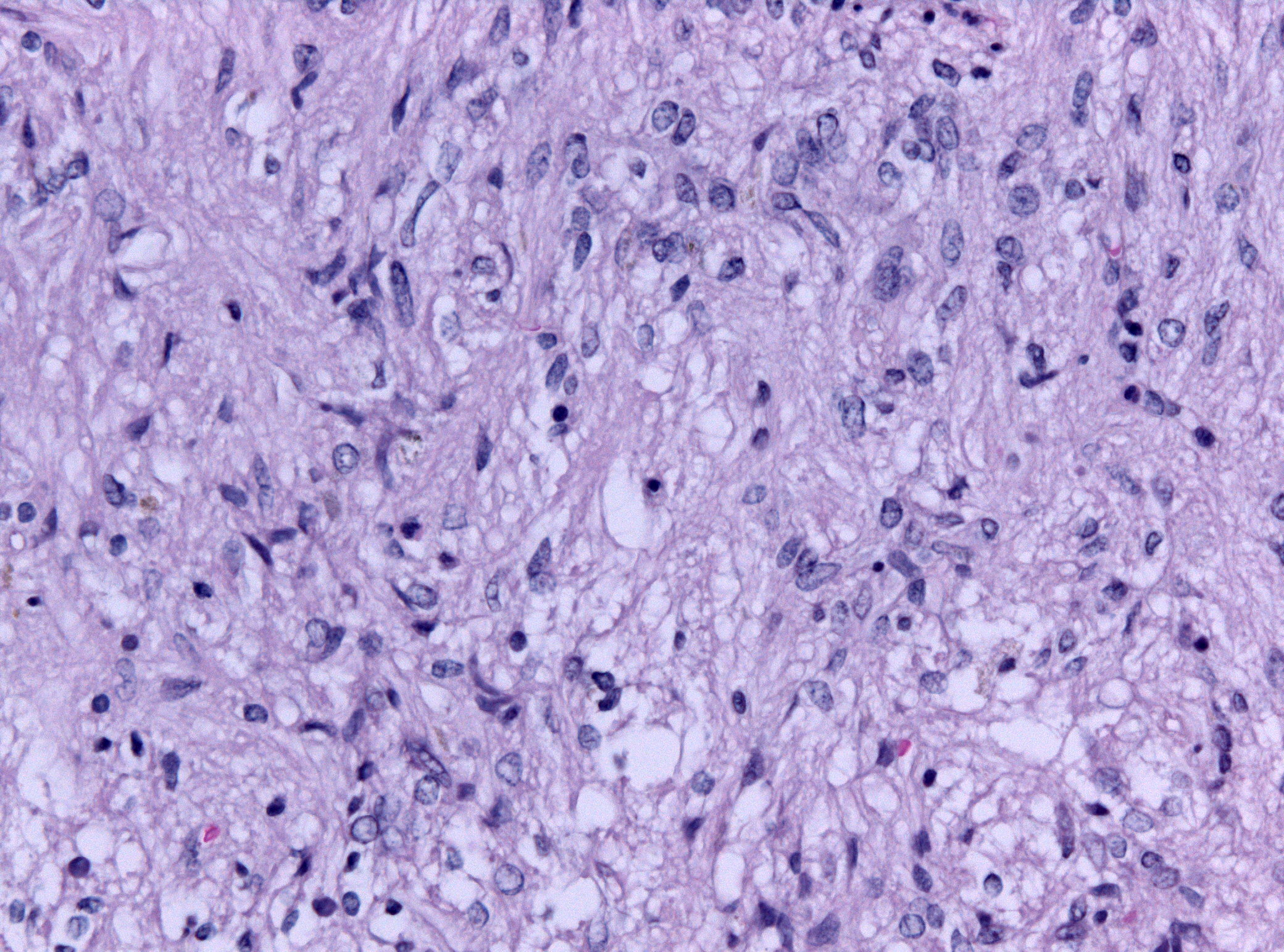
- Biopsy specimen of a pituicytoma of the posterior pituitary gland (H&E stain, x200 magnification)
- Specialty: Oncology

Pituicytoma is a rare brain tumor. It grows at the base of the brain from the pituitary gland. This tumor is thought to be derived from the parenchymal cells of the posterior lobe of the pituitary gland, called pituicytes. Some researchers believe that they arise from the folliculostellate cells in the anterior lobe of the pituitary. As such, it is a low-grade glioma. It occurs in adults and symptoms include visual disturbance and endocrine dysfunction. They are often mistaken for pituitary adenomas which have a similar presentation and occur in the same location. The treatment consists of surgical resection, which is curative in most cases.
