= Neurohypophysial hormone =

Neurohypophysial hormones, N-terminal Domain
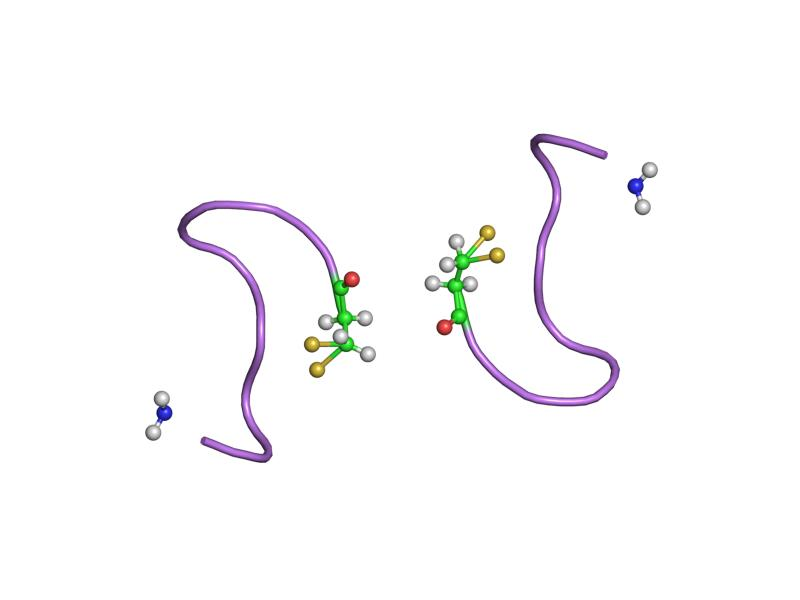
- crystal structure analysis of deamino-oxytocin. This image shows conformational flexibility and receptor binding of the hormone to oxytocin receptors

Identifiers
- Symbol: Hormone_4
- Pfam: PF00220
- InterPro: IPR022423
- PROSITE: PDOC00237
- SCOP2: 1xy1 / SCOPe / SUPFAM
Available protein structures:
- PDB: IPR022423 PF00220 (ECOD; PDBsum)
- AlphaFold: IPR022423; PF00220

Neurohypophysial hormones, C-terminal Domain
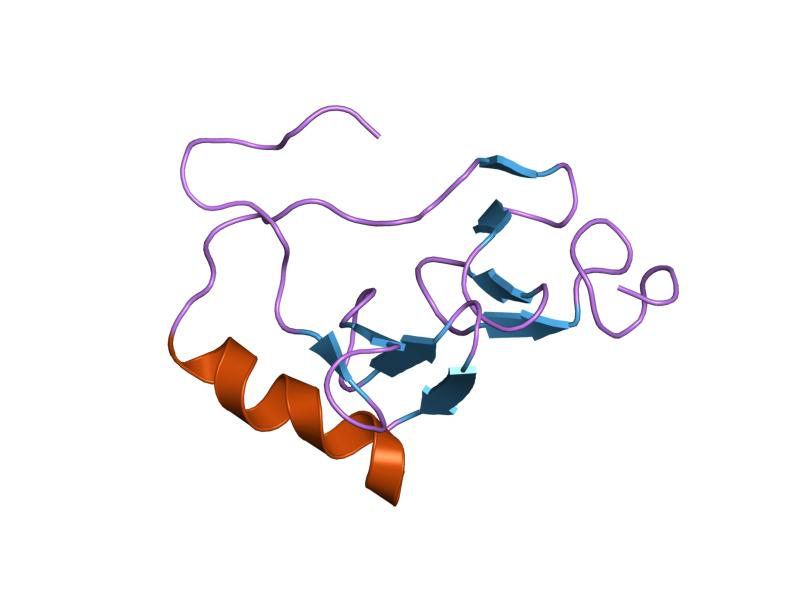
- solution structure of the monomeric form of a mutant unliganded bovine neurophysin, minimized average structure

Identifiers
- Symbol: Hormone_5
- Pfam: PF00184
- InterPro: IPR000981
- PROSITE: PDOC00237
- SCOP2: 1xy2 / SCOPe / SUPFAM
Available protein structures:
- PDB: IPR000981 PF00184 (ECOD; PDBsum)
- AlphaFold: IPR000981; PF00184

The neurohypophysial hormones form a family of structurally and functionally related peptide hormones. Their representatives in humans are oxytocin and vasopressin. They are named after the location of their release into the blood, the neurohypophysis (another name for the posterior pituitary).

Most of the circulating oxytocin and vasopressin hormones are synthesized in magnocellular neurosecretory cells of the supraoptic nucleus and paraventricular nucleus of the hypothalamus. They are then transported in neurosecretory granules along axons within the hypothalamo-neurohypophysial tract by axoplasmic flow to axon terminals forming the pars nervosa of the posterior pituitary. There, they are stored in Herring bodies and can be released into the circulation on the basis of hormonal and synaptic signals with assistance from pituicytes.

Oxytocin mediates contraction of the smooth muscle of the uterus and mammary gland, while vasopressin has antidiuretic action on the kidney, and mediates vasoconstriction of the peripheral vessels. Due to the similarity of the two hormones, there is cross-reaction: oxytocin has a slight antidiuretic function, and high levels of AVP can cause uterine contractions. In common with most active peptides, both hormones are synthesised as larger protein precursors that are enzymatically converted to their mature forms.

Members of this family are found in birds, fish, reptiles and amphibians (mesotocin, isotocin, valitocin, glumitocin, aspargtocin, vasotocin, seritocin, asvatocin, phasvatocin), in worms (annetocin, nematocin), octopuses (cephalotocin, octopressin), insects (locupressin, inotocin) and in molluscs (conopressins G and S). Animals that lack a hormone from this family include fruit flies, and at least some mosquitos, silkworms, and honeybees.
