= Hyperpituitarism =

Excess output of hormones by the pituitary gland

- Pituitary gland
- Specialty: Endocrinology
- Symptoms: Hirsutism
- Causes: From a pituitary microadenoma.
- Diagnostic method: MRI
- Treatment: Dopamine agonists

Hyperpituitarism is a condition due to the primary hypersecretion of pituitary hormones; it typically results from a pituitary adenoma. In children with hyperpituitarism, disruption of growth regulation is rare, either because of hormone hypersecretion or because of manifestations caused by local compression of the adenoma.

== Symptoms and signs ==
Symptoms caused by hormone excess and associated mass effects include:

- Acromegaly
- Hirsutism
- Visual field loss or double vision
- Excessive sweating
- Decreased libido
- Lethargy
- Headache
- Muscle weakness
- Bruisability

== Cause ==
The cause of hyperpituitarism in most cases is due to pituitary adenomas. They usually come from the anterior lobe, are functional and secrete the hormone, GH and prolactin.

== Mechanism ==
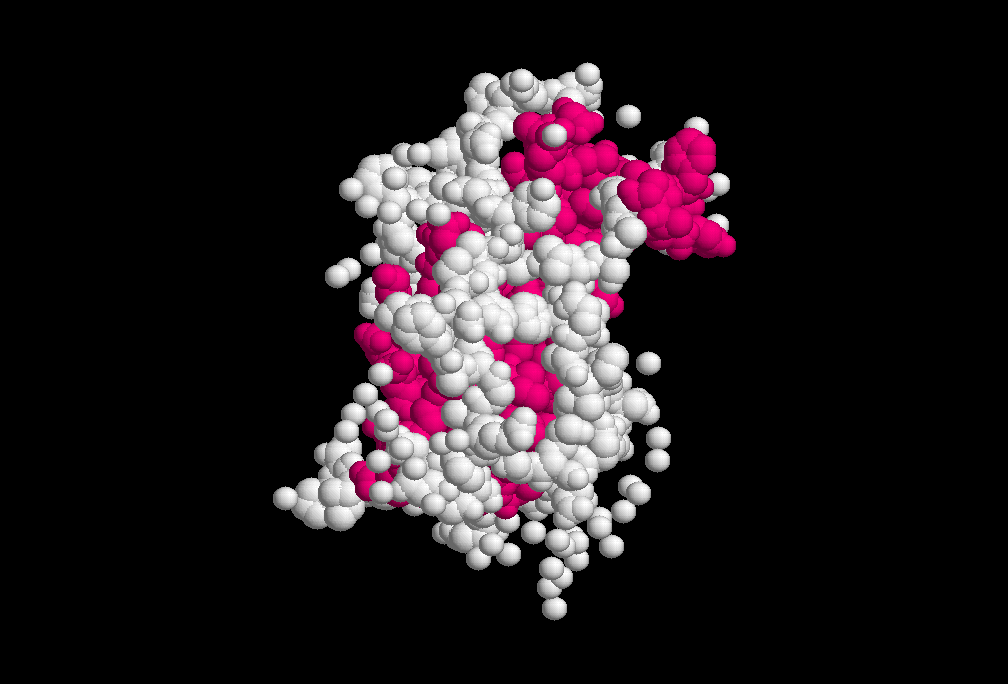
Growth hormone

Evidence indicates that the mechanism of hyperpituitarism can originate from genetic disruption causing pituitary tumorigenesis, most pituitary adenomas are monoclonal, which in turn indicates their origin from an event in a single cell. There are three hormones that are oversecreted resulting in the pituitary adenoma: prolactin, adrenocorticotropic hormone (ACTH), and growth hormone (GH).

Prolactinoma results in overproduction of prolactin Excess GH results in gigantism, the severity of gigantism depends on whether the epiphyseal plate is open. The four most common types of hyperpituitarism are caused by 4 types of pituitary adenoma, as follows: prolactinoma, corticotropinoma (Cushing's disease), somatotropinoma (gigantism), and thyrotropinoma.

== Diagnosis ==
For the diagnosis of hyperpituitarism it depends on the cell type(s) affected, clinical manifestations of hormone excess may include, gigantism or acromegaly, which can be identified by clinical and radiographic results. Cushing's disease diagnosis is done with a physical examination, laboratory tests and MRI of the pituitary gland (to locate tumors) For prolactinoma, diagnosis comes in the form of the measurement of serum prolactin levels and MRI of pituitary gland.

== Treatment ==
Dopamine

Treatment (for hyperpituitarism) in the case of prolactinoma consists of long-term medical management. Dopamine agonists are strong suppressors of PRL secretion and establish normal gonadal function. It also inhibits tumor cell replication (in some cases causes tumor shrinkage) Treatment for gigantism begins with establishing target goals for IGF-1, transsphenoidal surgery (somatostatin receptor ligands- preoperatively) and postoperative imaging assessment. For Cushing's disease there is surgery to extract the tumor; after surgery, the gland may slowly start to work again, though not always.

== See also ==
- Hypopituitarism
