= Highlands Hospital =

Coordinates: 51.64489°N 0.11089°W

- Enfield District Health Authority
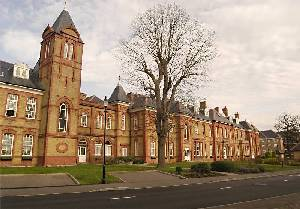
- The Northern Convalescent Fever Hospital building, now residential apartments

- Location within Enfield

Geography
- Location: Winchmore Hill, Greater London, England, United Kingdom

Organisation
- Care system: NHS England
- Type: District General
- Affiliated university: None

Services
- Emergency department: None
- Beds: 550 (in 1973)

History
- Founded: c. 1883
- Closed: 1993; 33 years ago

Links
- Lists: Hospitals in England

Highlands Hospital was a hospital in Winchmore Hill, in the London Borough of Enfield which closed in 1993. The site was redeveloped for residential accommodation, although many of the original buildings remain. The site is designated a conservation area and the former ambulance station is a grade II listed building.

== History ==
The site was part of the Chaseville Park estate (originally part of Enfield Chase) and was acquired by the Metropolitan Asylums Board in 1883–4. In May 1885 the foundation stone was laid of what was originally to be named The Northern Convalescent Fever Hospital, and the hospital opened on 25 September 1887, having been designed by architects Pennington and Bridgen.

Rather than having a single large building, the hospital comprised several smaller buildings, known as villas. In 1890, temporary huts were erected to increase capacity. The following year, further temporary iron huts were erected on a neighbouring site to the north of the existing hospital. During 1892 and 1893, 200 cases of scarlet fever were treated in the Enfield Isolation Hospital by a Dr. J. J. Ridge, with a mortality rate of 2.5 per cent, compared to a 6.3 per cent mortality rate in other hospitals under the control of the Metropolitan Asylums Board in 1893.

In 1900, Enfield Urban District Council replaced these with a new isolation hospital, named Enfield Isolation Hospital, designed by the district council surveyor, a Mr Collins, and built by Chesoum and Sons. The Enfield and Edmonton Joint Hospital Board took control of Enfield Isolation Hospital in 1905. The main purpose of the hospital was to deal with infectious diseases with the notable exception of smallpox.

Control of the Northern Convalescent Fever Hospital was transferred to London County Council in 1930, and the site served as an emergency bed service hospital during World War II. In 1938, four additional single storey ward blocks were added to the Enfield Isolation Hospital.

Nurses' badge

After the war, 200 post-encephalitic Parkinsonism patients were cared for at the hospital by consultant geriatrician and former general practitioner Joseph Sharkey, whose work at the hospital included the early trials of levodopa in Parkinsonism.

Both the Northern Convalescent Fever Hospital and Enfield Isolation Hospital came under the control of the National Health Service on its formation in 1948, and both hospitals were renamed. The Northern Convalescent Fever Hospital became Highlands Hospital, and the Enfield Isolation Hospital became South Lodge Hospital. At this time, Highlands comprised 16 buildings with 480 beds.

In 1966, the hospitals were merged, with the new hospital retaining the Highlands name. The hospital became an acute hospital and had 550 beds in 1973.

The site was designated a conservation area by the Greater London Council in 1986. In the same year, Enfield District Health Authority announced plans to close the hospital complex.

In 1993, Enfield District Health Authority (which was itself disbanded in 1996) agreed to the disposal of the 53-acre (210,000 m^{2}) site to developers. The site was purchased for around £20 million. Some of the proceeds were used to construct the Highlands wing at Chase Farm Hospital. Many of the old Highlands / Northern Convalescent Fever Hospital buildings were retained, but the South Lodge / Enfield Isolation Hospital buildings were demolished to make way for a supermarket. A report published later by the borough council stated that the demolition of the historic South Lodge buildings was "in retrospect an unfortunate loss for the character of the area."

== Notable former staff ==
- Joseph Sharkey, whose work at the hospital included the early trials of levodopa in Parkinsonism, cared for 200 post-encephalitic Parkinsonism patients shortly after the second world war.
- Peggy Mardell began her training as a fever nurse at Highlands aged 17, since general nurse training was not available below the age of 19. She became the regional nursing officer of the North West Thames Health Authority and was appointed a CBE in 1982 for her services to healthcare.
- James Purdon Martin's book The Basal Ganglia Posture (1967) includes case histories and clinical observations of a large group of patients with post-encephalitic Parkinsonism who were long-stay patients at Highlands Hospital.
- Thomas Lansley worked as a medical laboratory technician at Highlands and went on to co-found the Council for Professions Supplementary to Medicine and chair the Institute of Medical Laboratory Scientists. His son, Andrew, was Secretary of State for Health from 2010 to 2012.

== See also ==
- Healthcare in London
- List of hospitals in England
- Grove Fever Hospital
