= Autoimmune hypophysitis =

Inflammation of the pituitary gland due to autoimmune dysfunction

- Other names: Lymphocytic hypophysitis
- Specialty: Endocrinology

Autoimmune hypophysitis is defined as inflammation of the pituitary gland due to autoimmunity.

== Signs and symptoms ==
Autoimmune hypophysitis can lead to deficiencies in one or more pituitary hormones, causing central diabetes insipidus if the posterior pituitary gland is affected as well as central adrenal insufficiency and central hypothyroidism if the anterior pituitary gland is affected. The symptoms depend on what part of the pituitary is affected. Lymphocytic adenohypophysitis (LAH) occurs when the anterior pituitary cells are affected by autoimmune inflammation resulting in either no symptoms, adrenal insufficiency (if the ACTH producing cells are affected), hypothyroidism (if the TSH producing cells are damaged), or hypogonadism (if the LH and/or FSH producing cells are involved). In some cases, the presence of inflammation within the pituitary gland leads to interruption of dopamine flow from the hypothalamus into the pituitary causing high levels of the hormone prolactin and, often as a consequence, milk production from the breasts (in older girls and women). Lymphocytic Infundibuloneurohypophysitis (LINH) occurs when the posterior pituitary is affected resulting in diabetes insipidus. Both LAH and LINH may also lead to symptoms of an intracranial mass such as headache or disturbance of vision, i.e. bitemporal hemianopia. The pituitary produces multiple hormones relating to various metabolic functions. Sufficiently low production of certain pituitary hormones can be fatal resulting in the failure of the thyroid or adrenal glands. Common symptoms include nausea, vomiting, fatigue, loss of libido, amenorrhea, and dizziness. It is estimated that, typically, it takes from 12 to 40 years for autoimmune destruction to present symptoms. However, there have been cases of isolated attacks as a result of drug reactions (i.e., use of blocking antibody ipilimumab) or idiopathic events that have presented symptoms which may disappear after relatively short term treatment (i.e., 1 year on corticoids or other immune suppressants). However, more rapid development of the disorder is the rule when it occurs during, or shortly after, pregnancy (even after miscarriage or abortion). Indeed, autoimmune hypophysitis occurs more commonly during and shortly after pregnancy than at any other time.

=== Antibodies ===
80% of patients with pituitary antibodies also have antibodies to thyroid gland or its hormones. Likewise, 20% of autoimmune thyroid patients also have pituitary antibodies. It follows that a subset of thyroid patients may have a disease related to autoimmune hypophysitis. Recent research has focused on a defect at the CTLA-4 gene which, coupled with other factors, may result in autoimmunity primarily focusing on certain endocrine glands including the pituitary and thyroid.

== Cause ==
Most cases are autoimmune, some related to thyroid autoimmunity.

== Diagnosis ==
Lymphocytic hypophysitis continues to be a diagnosis of exclusion, and histopathology with tissue biopsy is needed for a definitive diagnosis. However, clinical, laboratory data, and imaging can all help with the diagnosis. First and foremost, patients present with symptoms of hypopituitarism and must undergo pituitary hormone function evaluation. Biopsy is the only means of accurate diagnosis as no autoantigen has been discovered. Biopsy of the pituitary gland is not easily performed with safety as it sits under the brain, however, a test does exist to detect antibodies to the pituitary without biopsy: autoantibodies to M(r) 49,000 pituitary cytosolic protein may represent markers for an immunological process affecting the pituitary gland. Tests for normal pituitary gland hormone production tend to be expensive and in some cases difficult to administer. In addition, certain hormone levels vary largely throughout the day and in response to metabolic factors, making abnormal levels difficult to calibrate—further hampering diagnosis. Assessment for other autoimmune and inflammatory diseases should also be performed by obtaining complete blood count, complete metabolic panel, c-reactive protein, erythrocyte sedimentation rate, antinuclear antibody, and lupus antibodies at the very least. Gadolinium-enhanced MRI of the pituitary is the imaging of choice as well, and it is important to distinguish lymphocytic hypophysitis from a pituitary adenoma.

== Treatment ==
Inflammation typically resolves after several months of glucocorticoid treatment In patients unresponsive to, or have relapsing symptoms after corticosteroid treatment, immunosuppressive medications such as methotrexate, azathioprine, and cyclosporine are often prescribed. In particular, combined azathioprine/glucocorticoid therapy has been shown to successfully treat recurrent hypophysitis. Some cases of hyperprolactinemia due to pituitary inflammation have been treated with combined dopamine agonists - such as cabergoline/bromocriptine.

Surgery is only an option for those suffering from visual problems/ophthalmoplegia, are suffering a mass-like effect from compression of nearby brain structures, or for the purposes of diagnostic histology.

== Epidemiology ==
A large scale study on cadavers done in Sweden, performed biopsies on hundreds of pituitary glands. The study indicated that perhaps as much as 5% of the population experiences some amount of autoimmune pituitary destruction. It is further hypothesized that perhaps half that many show, or may experience, clinical manifestations. The prevalence of all the types of hypophysitis is low, with an incidence of approximately 1 in 9 million. However, it is thought that this may be an underestimate, especially due to the recent use of immune checkpoint inhibitors for cancer treatments, which have endocrine side effects affecting the pituitary gland. Although cases have been reported in children and the elderly, the mean age of diagnosis for men is 44.7 years, and the mean age of diagnosis for women is 34 years.

== History ==
Autoimmune attack of the pituitary gland resulting in reduced hormone production was first discovered as a result of an autopsy in 1962. The autopsy described destruction of the pituitary and thyroid consistent with autoimmune attack and included atrophy of the adrenal glands. As magnetic resonance imaging became more available diagnosis increased dramatically. At this time it is believed that the disease is far more prevalent than is diagnosed. Nevertheless, autoimmune hypophysitis is frequently referred to as a rare disease and the most recent estimates as to its prevalence give it a value of around 5 per million.

== See also ==
- Hypophysitis
- Hypopituitarism
- Pituitary disease
