= Renate Pickardt =

German endocrinologist (1936–2024)

Caroline Renate Pickardt
- Born: 5 September 1936; Plettenberg, Gau Westphalia-South, Germany
- Died: 21 April 2024 (aged 87); Düsseldorf, North Rhine-Westphalia, Germany
- Education: LMU Munich
- Known for: Pickardt-Fahlbusch syndrome
- Scientific career
- Fields: Endocrinology, medicine
- Thesis: Veränderungen des Sekretintestes bei subaciden, cholecystektomierten und pankreaskranken Patienten (1965)

Caroline Renate Pickardt (5 September 1936 – 21 April 2024) was a German endocrinologist. The main focus of her scientific work was in the area of thyroid diseases (thyroidology). She published fundamental articles on functional thyroid disorders and the pathophysiology of goitre.

== Biography ==
Pickardt was born on 5 September 1936. After receiving her doctorate in 1965 at LMU Munich with a dissertation titled "Veränderungen des Sekretintestes bei subaciden, cholecystektomierten und pankreaskranken Patienten" (Changes of the secretin test in subacid patients after cholecystectomy and with pancreatic diseases) she habilitated in 1972 at LMU Munich with a treatise titled "Stimulation der TSH-Sekretion durch TRH (Thyrotropin Releasing Hormone): diagnostische Bedeutung und pathophysiologische Folgerungen" (Stimulation of thyrotropin secretion by TRH (thyrotropin releasing hormone): diagnostic utility and pathophysiological consequences). On 18 January 1973, she was appointed Privatdozent, in 1979 Professor.

During her scientific life Pickard managed a number of scientific conferences and published more than 80 papers and several books on thyroid disorders and endocrine ophthalmopathy. Together with Rudolf Fahlbusch she described a form of tertiary hypothyroidism in pituitary stalk transection syndrome (Pickardt-Fahlbusch syndrome).

From 2001 she was an emeritus professor. Pickardt died on 21 April 2024, at the age of 87.

== Selected publications ==
- C. R. Pickardt, W. Geiger, R. Fahlbusch und P. C. Scriba. Stimulation der TSH-Sekretion durch TRF-Belastung bei hypothalamischen und hypophysären Krankheitsbildern. Klin. Wschr. (1972) 50, 42–59
- Johannes Köbberling, Caroline R. Pickardt (Hrsg.). Struma. Springer Berlin Heidelberg 1990. ISBN 3540510672
- Reinhard Ziegler, Caroline R. Pickardt, Rolf-Peter Willig. Rationelle Diagnostik in der Endokrinologie. Georg-Thieme-Verlag Stuttgart 1993. ISBN 3131155019
