= James Purdon Martin =

British neurologist

- Born: 11 June 1893; Jordanstown, County Antrim, United Kingdom of Great Britain and Ireland
- Died: 7 May 1984 (aged 90); National Hospital, Queen Square, London, England
- Occupation: Neurologist
- Known for: description of fragile X syndrome, sometimes called the Martin-Bell syndrome; introduction of a general classification of negative symptoms of basal ganglia disease

James Purdon Martin FRCP (1893–1984) was a British neurologist.

== Education ==
After education at the Royal Belfast Academical Institution, J. Purdon Martin matriculated in 1912 at Queen's University Belfast and graduated there in with BA in 1915 and MA in 1918. During WWI he attempted to enlist in the British Army but he was graded as medically unfit because of his severe psoriasis. He graduated MB BCh BAO in 1920 and MD in 1922.

== Career ==
He held a house appointment in Liverpool for about a year and then in March 1921 joined the staff of London's National Hospital for Nervous Diseases. There he was appointed to the consultant staff in 1925 and was dean of the medical school from 1944 to 1948. He qualified MRCP in 1922 and was elected FRCP in 1930. He was appointed to the consultant staffs of several hospitals in London. During WWII he was neurologist to Eastern Command. J. Purdon Martin gave the Lumleian lectures in 1947 on Consciousness and its disturbances considered from the neurological aspect and in 1963 the Arris and Gale lecture on Basal ganglia and locomotion. He was joint editor of Neurology for a number of years. For the academic year 1959–1960 he was a visiting professor at the University of Colorado Denver.

... in 1927 he established the association between hemiballismus and partial lesion of the Body of Luys. Since most of his work was clinical his reputation depended on sound observation leading to accurate diagnosis and selective treatment and was not to be found through lengthy lists of publications but rather embodied as a corpus of experience in his invited contributions, such as the 8th and especially the (1956) 9th editions of the magisterial (Price's) Textbook of Medicine.

Martin's book The Basal Ganglia and Posture (1967) includes case histories and clinical observations of a large group of patients with post-encephalitic Parkinsonism who were long-stay patients at Highlands Hospital, Winchmore Hill.

Oliver Sacks, an American professor of neurology, wrote: 'Purdon Martin was endlessly thoughtful and ingenious in designing a variety of mechanisms and methods that made it possible for even the most incapacitated patient with Parkinsonism to achieve an artificial normality in gait and posture; lines painted on the floor, counterweights in the belt, loudly ticking pacemakers to set the cadence for walking, and these he always learned from his patients to whom his great book is dedicated. ...'

— Oliver Sacks, The Man Who Mistook His Wife for a Hat., Part 1 – 7 On the Level

== Personal life ==
Martin married in 1922, was bereaved in 1937, and married again in 1947. He married Dr. Majorie Ada Blandy (1892–1937) in 1922. His second marriage, in 1947, was to Janet Smiles Ferguson (née Nichols) (1895–1978). There were two sons from his first marriage. There were no children from his second marriage.

== Selected publications ==
- with J. G. Greenfield: Martin, J. P.; Greenfield, J. G. (1923). "Tumour in Cisterna Magna". Proc R Soc Med. 16(Neurol Sect) (Neurol Sect): 32–35. PMC 2103552. PMID 19983065.
- Martin, J. P. (1925). "The Syphilitic Forms of Progressive Muscular Atrophy". Proc R Soc Med. 18(Neurol Sect) (Neurol Sect): 13–20. PMC 2202441. PMID 19984439.
- Martin, J. P. (1925). "A Case of Facial Hemiatrophy: Lack of Development of the Breast on the same side". Proc R Soc Med. 18(Neurol Sect) (Neurol Sect): 31. PMC 2202449. PMID 19984453.
- Martin, J. P. (October 1927). "Recovery, with Hemiplegia, from Vaccination Encephalitis". Proc R Soc Med. 20 (12): 1838. doi:10.1177/003591572702001231. PMC 2101511. PMID 19986115.
- Martin, James Purdon (1 October 1927). "Hemichorea resulting from a local lesion of the brain. (The syndrome of the body of Luys)". Brain. 50 (3–4): 637–649. doi:10.1093/brain/50.3-4.637.
- Martin, J. P. (23 June 1928). "Tumours of the frontal lobe of the brain". Br Med J. 1 (3520): 1058–1061. doi:10.1136/bmj.1.3520.1058. PMC 2456191. PMID 20773963.
- Martin, J. P. (28 March 1931). "A case of glossopharyngeal neuralgia". Br Med J. 1 (3664): 533–534. doi:10.1136/bmj.1.3664.533. PMC 2314542. PMID 20776085.
- Martin, J. P. (May 1933). "Acute Benign Myelitis (Encephalo-myelitis)". Proc R Soc Med. 26 (7): 843–844. doi:10.1177/003591573302600725. PMC 2204677.
- Martin, J. P. (May 1933). "Progressive Syndrome of Muscular Rigidity and Tonic Involuntary Movements". Proc R Soc Med. 26 (7): 847–848. doi:10.1177/003591573302600729. PMC 2204625.
- Martin, J. P. (30 December 1933). "The bearing of recent work on certain aspects of poliomyelitis". Br Med J. 2 (3808): 1200–1202. doi:10.1136/bmj.2.3808.1200. PMC 2369933. PMID 20777970.
- with N. S. Alcock: Martin, James Purdon; Alcock, N. S. (1 December 1934). "Hemichorea associated with a lesion of the corpus Luysii". Brain. 57 (4): 504–516. doi:10.1093/brain/57.4.504.
- Martin, J. P. (May 1937). "Traumatic Intracranial Aneurysm". Proc R Soc Med. 30 (7): 854–855. doi:10.1177/003591573703000709. PMC 2075879. PMID 19991120.
- Martin, J. P. (27 November 1937). "Mental symptoms associated with head injury". Br Med J. 2 (4012): 1061–1064. doi:10.1136/bmj.2.4012.1061. PMC 2087773. PMID 20781075.
- Martin, J. P. (September 1939). "Secondary Carcinoma of Spine treated by Deep X-rays". Proc R Soc Med. 32 (11): 1421–1422. doi:10.1177/003591573903201144. PMC 1998032. PMID 19992125.
- with Denis Williams: Martin, J. P.; Williams, D. (September 1939). "Unusual Cortical Potentials in a Case of Porencephaly". Proc R Soc Med. 32 (11): 1417–1419. doi:10.1177/003591573903201141. PMC 1998065. PMID 19992121.
- with H. L. Sheehan: Martin, J. P.; Sheehan, H. L. (8 March 1941). "Primary Thrombosis of Cerebral Veins (following Childbirth)". Br Med J. 1 (4183): 349–353. doi:10.1136/bmj.1.4183.349. PMC 2161360. PMID 20783556.
- Martin, J. P. (5 April 1941). "Cerebral Venous Thrombosis after Childbirth". Br Med J. 1 (4187): 534–535. doi:10.1136/bmj.1.4187.534-c. PMC 2161156.
- Martin, J. P. (18 October 1941). "Thrombosis in the Superior Longitudinal Sinus following Childbirth". Br Med J. 2 (4215): 537–540. doi:10.1136/bmj.2.4215.537. PMC 2163122. PMID 20783911.
- with H. L. Sheehan: Martin, J. P.; Sheehan, H. L. (25 April 1942). "Puerperal Cerebral Thrombosis". Br Med J. 1 (4242): 538–539. doi:10.1136/bmj.1.4242.538-c. PMC 2160704.
- Martin, J. P. (May 1944). "Venous Thrombosis in the Central Nervous System". Proc R Soc Med. 37 (7): 383–392. doi:10.1177/003591574403700720. PMC 2181125. PMID 19992857.
- Martin, J. P. (2 March 1946). "Acroparaesthesia in the Lower Limbs". Br Med J. 1 (4443): 307–308. doi:10.1136/bmj.1.4443.307. PMC 2058316. PMID 20786578.
- Martin, J. P. (15 May 1948). "Treatment of Neurosyphilis with Penicillin". Br Med J. 1 (4558): 922–926. doi:10.1136/bmj.1.4558.922. PMC 2090635. PMID 18858437.
- Martin, J. P. (31 July 1948). "Penicillin in the Treatment of Neurosyphilis". Br Med J. 2 (4569): 268. doi:10.1136/bmj.2.4569.268-a. PMC 2091026.
- Martin, J. P. (1 April 1950). "Headache". Br Med J. 1 (4656): 778–780. doi:10.1136/bmj.1.4656.778. PMC 2037100. PMID 20787843.
- Martin, J. P. (April 1954). "Pure Word Blindness Considered as a Disturbance of Visual Space Perception [Abridged]". Proc R Soc Med. 47 (4): 293–295. doi:10.1177/003591575404700412. PMC 1918816. PMID 13155540.
- Martin, J. P. (20 August 1955). "Signs of Obstruction of the Superior Longitudinal Sinus following Closed Head Injuries (Traumatic Hydrocephalus". Br Med J. 2 (4937): 467–470. doi:10.1136/bmj.2.4937.467. PMC 1980632. PMID 13240151.
- Martin, J. Purdon (1 March 1957). "Hemichorea (hemiballismus) without lesions in the corpus Luysii". Brain. 80 (1): 1–10. doi:10.1093/brain/80.1.1. PMID 13412992.
- Martin, J. P. (October 1971). "British neurology in the last fifty years: some personal experiences". Proc R Soc Med. 64 (10): 1055–1059. doi:10.1177/003591577106401022. PMC 1812784. PMID 4947527.
- Martin, J. P. (15 July 1972). "Conquest of general paralysis". Br Med J. 3 (5819): 159–160. doi:10.1136/bmj.3.5819.159. PMC 1788561. PMID 4557082.
- Martin, J. P. (22 December 1973). "Neurology in fiction: The Turn of the Screw". Br Med J. 4 (5894): 717–721. doi:10.1136/bmj.4.5894.717. PMC 1587900. PMID 4591002.
