= HESX1 =

Protein-coding gene in the species Homo sapiens

Identifiers
- Aliases: HESX1, ANF, CPHD5, RPX, HESX homeobox 1
- External IDs: OMIM: 601802; MGI: 96071; GeneCards: HESX1
Available structures
PDB	Ortholog search: PDBe RCSB
PDB	List of PDB id codes 2K40

Gene location (Human)
Chr.	Chromosome 3 (human)
Band	3p14.3	Start	57,197,838 bp
Band	3p14.3	End	57,227,606 bp

Gene location (Mouse)
Chr.	Chromosome 14 (mouse)
Band	14|14 A3	Start	26,716,373 bp
Band	14|14 A3	End	26,724,286 bp
RNA expression pattern
Bgee	Human / Mouse (ortholog); Top expressed in: buccal mucosa cell; testicle; gonad; right testis; left testis; ventricular zone; C1 segment; right lobe of liver; right adrenal gland; right adrenal cortex / Top expressed in: blastocyst; Rathke's pouch; embryo; embryo; endoderm; morula; epiblast; definitive endoderm; yolk sac; Stomodeum; More reference expression data
BioGPS	n/a
Gene ontology
Molecular function	sequence-specific DNA binding; protein C-terminus binding; chromatin binding; protein binding; protein N-terminus binding; DNA-binding transcription repressor activity, RNA polymerase II-specific; RNA polymerase II cis-regulatory region sequence-specific DNA binding; DNA binding; DNA-binding transcription factor activity, RNA polymerase II-specific
Cellular component	nucleus
Biological process	multicellular organism development; forebrain morphogenesis; brain development; nose development; negative regulation of transcription, DNA-templated; regulation of transcription, DNA-templated; transcription, DNA-templated; otic vesicle formation; negative regulation of transcription by RNA polymerase II; pituitary gland development; regulation of transcription by RNA polymerase II
Sources:Amigo / QuickGO
Orthologs
Databases	NCBI: entry; OMA: entry
Species	Human	Mouse
Entrez	8820	15209
Ensembl	ENSG00000163666	ENSMUSG00000040726
UniProt	Q9UBX0	Q61658
RefSeq (mRNA)	NM_003865; NM_001376058; NM_001376059; NM_001376060; NM_001376061	NM_010420
RefSeq (protein)	NP_003856; NP_001362987; NP_001362988; NP_001362989; NP_001362990	NP_034550
Location (UCSC)	Chr 3: 57.2 – 57.23 Mb	Chr 14: 26.72 – 26.72 Mb
PubMed search
- Wikidata
View/Edit Human	View/Edit Mouse

Homeobox expressed in ES cells 1, also known as homeobox protein ANF, is a homeobox protein that in humans is encoded by the HESX1 gene.

Expression of HEX1 and HESX1 marks the anterior visceral endoderm of the embryo. The AVE is an extra-embryonic tissue, key to the establishment of the anterior-posterior body axis.

== Clinical significance ==
Mutations in the HESX1 gene are associated with some cases of septo-optic dysplasia or Pickardt-Fahlbusch syndrome.
