= LHX3 =

Protein-coding gene in the species Homo sapiens

Identifiers
- Aliases: LHX3, CPHD3, LIM3, M2-LIM homeobox 3
- External IDs: OMIM: 600577; MGI: 102673; GeneCards: LHX3
Available structures
| PDB | Ortholog search: PDBe RCSB |
| PDB | List of PDB id codes 2JTN, 2RGT |

Gene location (Human)
| Chr. | Chromosome 9 (human) |
| Band | 9q34.3 | Start | 136,196,250 bp |
| Band | 9q34.3 | End | 136,205,128 bp |

Gene location (Mouse)
| Chr. | Chromosome 2 (mouse) |
| Band | 2 A3|2 18.44 cM | Start | 26,090,224 bp |
| Band | 2 A3|2 18.44 cM | End | 26,098,301 bp |
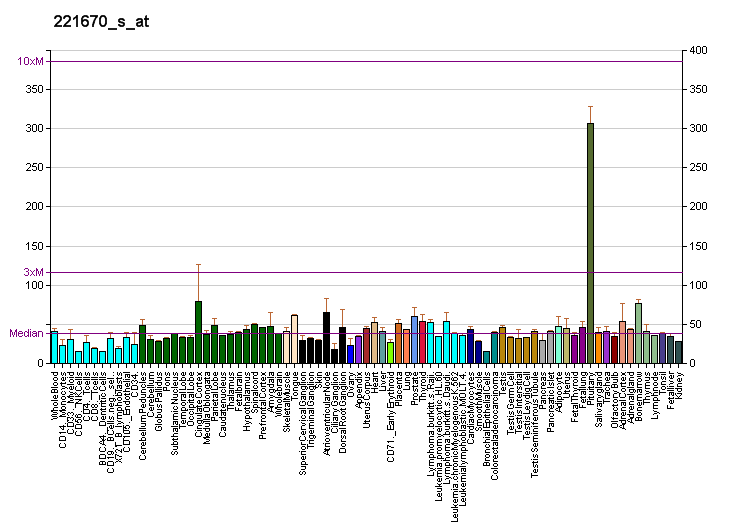
RNA expression pattern
| Bgee | Human / Mouse (ortholog); Top expressed in: pituitary gland; anterior pituitary; pancreatic ductal cell; tibialis anterior muscle; popliteal artery; testicle; Epithelium of choroid plexus; optic nerve; islet of Langerhans; nucleus of brain / Top expressed in: Rathke's pouch; pituitary gland; pars intermedia; vestibular sensory epithelium; pineal gland; pars distalis of adenohypophysis; embryo; neural layer of retina; utricle; pretectal area; More reference expression data |
| BioGPS | More reference expression data |
Gene ontology
| Molecular function | DNA binding; metal ion binding; RNA polymerase II cis-regulatory region sequence-specific DNA binding; DNA-binding transcription activator activity, RNA polymerase II-specific; sequence-specific DNA binding; DNA-binding transcription factor activity, RNA polymerase II-specific; RNA polymerase II transcription regulatory region sequence-specific DNA binding |
| Cellular component | transcription regulator complex; intracellular anatomical structure; nucleus |
| Biological process | ventral spinal cord interneuron specification; cell differentiation; pituitary gland development; regulation of transcription, DNA-templated; spinal cord association neuron differentiation; spinal cord motor neuron cell fate specification; placenta development; lung development; negative regulation of apoptotic process; transcription, DNA-templated; positive regulation of transcription, DNA-templated; animal organ morphogenesis; inner ear development; medial motor column neuron differentiation; motor neuron axon guidance; dorsal/ventral pattern formation; transcription by RNA polymerase II; positive regulation of transcription by RNA polymerase II; neuron differentiation |
Sources:Amigo / QuickGO
Orthologs
| Databases | NCBI: entry; OMA: entry |
| Species | Human | Mouse |
| Entrez | 8022 | 16871 |
| Ensembl | ENSG00000107187 | ENSMUSG00000026934 |
| UniProt | Q9UBR4 | P50481 |
| RefSeq (mRNA) | NM_014564; NM_178138; NM_001363746 | NM_001039653; NM_010711 |
| RefSeq (protein) | NP_055379; NP_835258; NP_001350675 | NP_001034742; NP_034841 |
| Location (UCSC) | Chr 9: 136.2 – 136.21 Mb | Chr 2: 26.09 – 26.1 Mb |
| PubMed search |
- Wikidata
| View/Edit Human | View/Edit Mouse |

LIM/homeobox protein Lhx3 is a protein that in humans is encoded by the LHX3 gene.

== Function ==
LHX3 encodes a protein of a large protein family, members of which carry the LIM domain, a unique cysteine-rich zinc-binding domain. The encoded protein is a transcription factor that is required for pituitary development and motor neuron specification. Two transcript variants encoding distinct isoforms have been identified for this gene.

== Clinical significance ==
Mutations in this gene have been associated with a syndrome of combined pituitary hormone deficiency and rigid cervical spine.

== Interactions ==
LHX3 has been shown to interact with LDB1.
