= PROP1 =

Human gene

Identifiers
- Aliases: PROP1, CPHD2, PROP-1, PROP paired-like homeobox 1
- External IDs: OMIM: 601538; MGI: 109330; GeneCards: PROP1

Gene location (Human)
Chr.	Chromosome 5 (human)
Band	5q35.3	Start	177,992,235 bp
Band	5q35.3	End	177,996,242 bp

Gene location (Mouse)
Chr.	Chromosome 11 (mouse)
Band	11 B1.3|11 30.95 cM	Start	50,841,633 bp
Band	11 B1.3|11 30.95 cM	End	50,844,592 bp
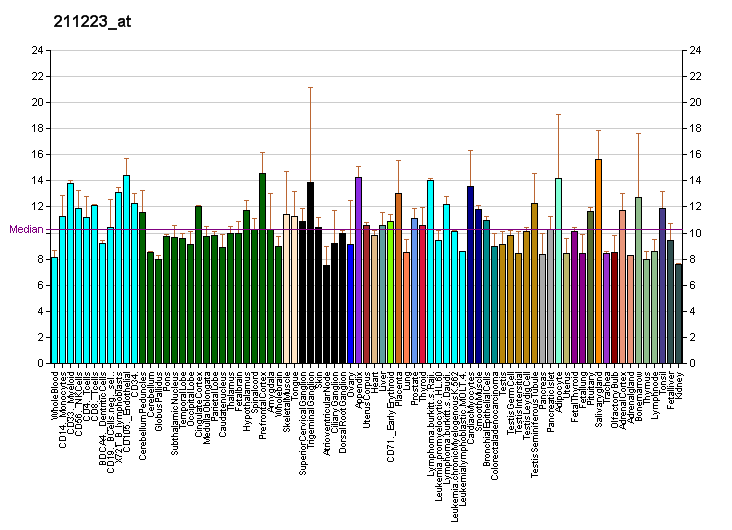
RNA expression pattern
Bgee	Human / Mouse (ortholog); Top expressed in: pituitary gland; anterior pituitary / Top expressed in: anterior pituitary; Rathke's pouch; embryo; pars distalis of adenohypophysis; blastocyst; lumbar spinal ganglion; digastric muscle; lumbar subsegment of spinal cord; carotid body; spleen; More reference expression data
BioGPS	More reference expression data
Gene ontology
Molecular function	RNA polymerase II cis-regulatory region sequence-specific DNA binding; DNA binding; sequence-specific DNA binding; beta-catenin binding; chromatin binding; DNA-binding transcription repressor activity, RNA polymerase II-specific; protein C-terminus binding; DNA-binding transcription activator activity, RNA polymerase II-specific; protein binding; DNA-binding transcription factor activity, RNA polymerase II-specific
Cellular component	transcription regulator complex; nucleus
Biological process	regulation of transcription, DNA-templated; somatotropin secreting cell differentiation; hypothalamus cell differentiation; hypophysis morphogenesis; negative regulation of apoptotic process; negative regulation of transcription by RNA polymerase II; transcription by RNA polymerase II; adenohypophysis development; central nervous system development; blood vessel development; animal organ morphogenesis; canonical Wnt signaling pathway; dorsal/ventral pattern formation; cell migration; positive regulation of transcription by RNA polymerase II; gland development
Sources:Amigo / QuickGO
Orthologs
Databases	NCBI: entry; OMA: entry
Species	Human	Mouse
Entrez	5626	19127
Ensembl	ENSG00000280635; ENSG00000175325; ENSG00000274382	ENSMUSG00000044542
UniProt	O75360	P97458
RefSeq (mRNA)	NM_006261	NM_008936
RefSeq (protein)	NP_006252	NP_032962
Location (UCSC)	Chr 5: 177.99 – 178 Mb	Chr 11: 50.84 – 50.84 Mb
PubMed search
- Wikidata
View/Edit Human	View/Edit Mouse

Homeobox protein prophet of PIT-1 is a protein that in humans is encoded by the PROP1 gene.

PROP1 has both DNA-binding and transcriptional activation ability. Its expression leads to ontogenesis of pituitary gonadotropes, as well as somatotropes, lactotropes, and caudomedial thyrotropes. Inactivating mutations in PROP1 result in deficiencies of luteinizing hormone (LH; MIM 152780), follicle-stimulating hormone (FSH; MIM 136530), growth hormone (GH; MIM 139250), prolactin (PRL; MIM 176760), and thyroid-stimulating hormone (TSH; MIM 188540). See combined pituitary hormone deficiency (CPHD; MIM 262600).[supplied by OMIM]
