= GPR101 =

Protein-coding gene in humans

Identifiers
- Aliases: GPR101, GPCR6, PAGH2, G protein-coupled receptor 101, PITA2
- External IDs: OMIM: 300393; MGI: 2685211; GeneCards: GPR101

Gene location (Human)
Chr.	X chromosome (human)
Band	Xq26.3	Start	137,023,929 bp
Band	Xq26.3	End	137,033,995 bp

Gene location (Mouse)
Chr.	X chromosome (mouse)
Band	X|X A6	Start	56,542,028 bp
Band	X|X A6	End	56,549,117 bp
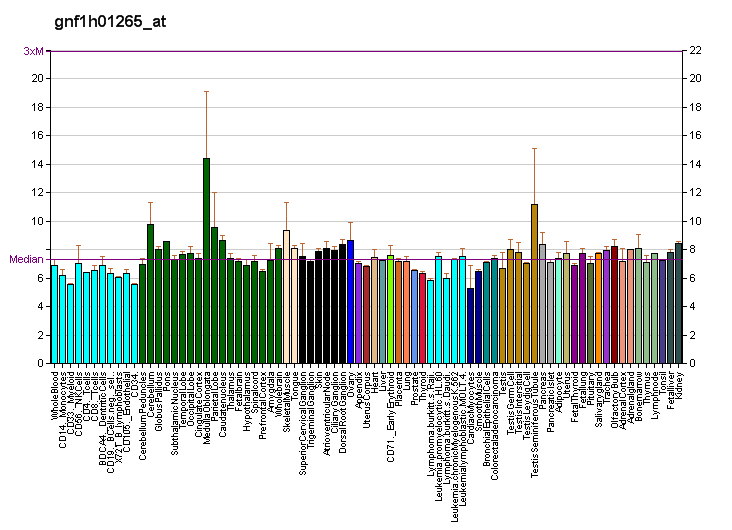
RNA expression pattern
Bgee	Human / Mouse (ortholog); Top expressed in: nucleus accumbens; caudate nucleus; hypothalamus; putamen; cerebellum; cerebellar cortex; cerebellar hemisphere; spinal cord; temporal lobe; C1 segment / Top expressed in: arcuate nucleus; lumbar subsegment of spinal cord; paraventricular nucleus of hypothalamus; subiculum; median eminence; dorsomedial hypothalamic nucleus; anterior amygdaloid area; ventromedial nucleus; nucleus accumbens; nucleus of stria terminalis; More reference expression data
BioGPS	More reference expression data
Gene ontology
Molecular function	G protein-coupled receptor activity; signal transducer activity; adrenergic receptor activity
Cellular component	integral component of membrane; receptor complex; plasma membrane; integral component of plasma membrane; membrane; intracellular anatomical structure
Biological process	adenylate cyclase-activating adrenergic receptor signaling pathway; cell-cell signaling; G protein-coupled receptor signaling pathway; signal transduction; adenylate cyclase-modulating G protein-coupled receptor signaling pathway
Sources:Amigo / QuickGO
Orthologs
Databases	NCBI: entry; OMA: entry
Species	Human	Mouse
Entrez	83550	245424
Ensembl	ENSG00000165370	ENSMUSG00000036357
UniProt	Q96P66	Q80T62
RefSeq (mRNA)	NM_054021	NM_001033360
RefSeq (protein)	NP_473362	NP_001028532
Location (UCSC)	Chr X: 137.02 – 137.03 Mb	Chr X: 56.54 – 56.55 Mb
PubMed search
- Wikidata
View/Edit Human	View/Edit Mouse

Probable G-protein coupled receptor 101 is a protein that is encoded by the GPR101 gene in humans.

G protein-coupled receptors (GPCRs, or GPRs) contain 7 transmembrane domains and transduce extracellular signals through heterotrimeric G proteins.

== Clinical significance ==
A duplication event in GPR101 is implicated in cases of gigantism and acromegaly.
