= LHX4 =

Protein-coding gene in humans

Identifiers
- Aliases: LHX4, CPHD4, LIM homeobox 4
- External IDs: OMIM: 602146; MGI: 101776; GeneCards: LHX4
Available structures
PDB	Ortholog search: PDBe RCSB
PDB	List of PDB id codes 3MMK

Gene location (Human)
Chr.	Chromosome 1 (human)
Band	1q25.2	Start	180,230,264 bp
Band	1q25.2	End	180,278,984 bp

Gene location (Mouse)
Chr.	Chromosome 1 (mouse)
Band	1 G3|1 67.47 cM	Start	155,573,777 bp
Band	1 G3|1 67.47 cM	End	155,627,430 bp
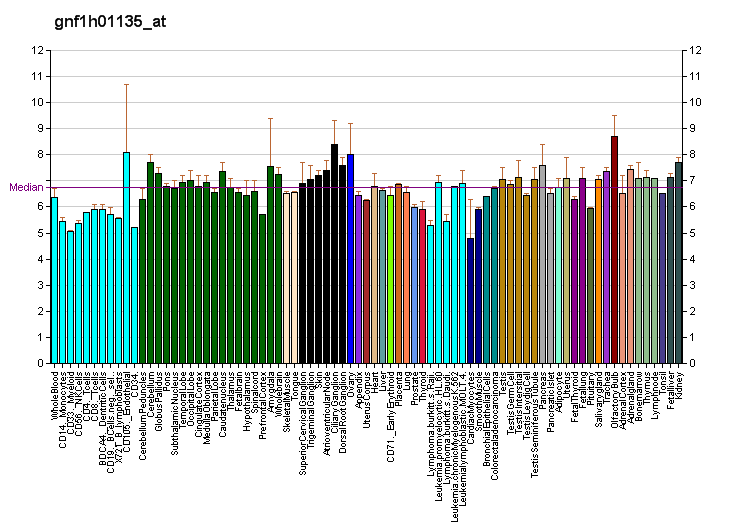
RNA expression pattern
Bgee	Human / Mouse (ortholog); Top expressed in: buccal mucosa cell; sperm; secondary oocyte; testicle; right hemisphere of cerebellum; left testis; body of pancreas; rectum; right testis; stromal cell of endometrium / Top expressed in: pineal gland; urethra; male urethra; serosa of urinary bladder; muscle layer of urethra; neural layer of retina; epithelium of male urethra; basal plate; rib; lamina propria of urinary bladder; More reference expression data
BioGPS	More reference expression data
Gene ontology
Molecular function	DNA binding; protein binding; metal ion binding; DNA-binding transcription activator activity, RNA polymerase II-specific; sequence-specific DNA binding; DNA-binding transcription factor activity, RNA polymerase II-specific; methyl-CpG binding; RNA polymerase II transcription regulatory region sequence-specific DNA binding
Cellular component	intracellular anatomical structure; nucleus
Biological process	animal organ morphogenesis; medial motor column neuron differentiation; negative regulation of apoptotic process; regulation of transcription, DNA-templated; motor neuron axon guidance; transcription, DNA-templated; placenta development; transcription by RNA polymerase II; positive regulation of transcription by RNA polymerase II; neuron differentiation
Sources:Amigo / QuickGO
Orthologs
Databases	NCBI: entry; OMA: entry
Species	Human	Mouse
Entrez	89884	16872
Ensembl	ENSG00000121454	ENSMUSG00000026468
UniProt	Q969G2	P53776
RefSeq (mRNA)	NM_033343	NM_010712
RefSeq (protein)	NP_203129	NP_034842
Location (UCSC)	Chr 1: 180.23 – 180.28 Mb	Chr 1: 155.57 – 155.63 Mb
PubMed search
- Wikidata
View/Edit Human	View/Edit Mouse

LIM/homeobox protein Lhx4 is a protein that in humans is encoded by the LHX4 gene.

This gene encodes a member of a large protein family which contains the LIM domain, a unique cysteine-rich zinc-binding domain. The encoded protein may function as a transcriptional regulator and be involved in control of differentiation and development of the pituitary gland. Mutations in this gene are associated with syndromic short stature and pituitary and hindbrain defects. An alternative splice variant has been described but its biological nature has not been determined.
