= Sheehan's syndrome =

- Other names: Simmond's syndrome, postpartum hypopituitarism, postpartum pituitary gland necrosis
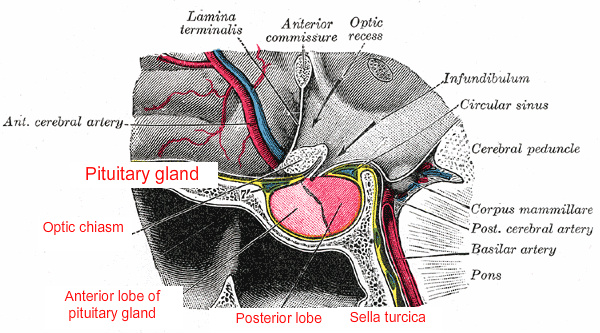
- Anatomy of normal pituitary gland and surrounding structures
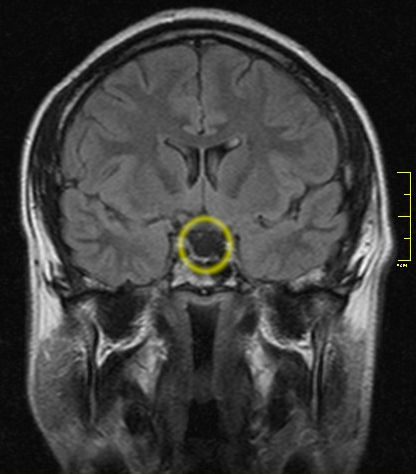
- Empty sella turcica on MRI as seen in severe cases of Sheehan's syndrome
- Specialty: Endocrinology, obstetrics and gynaecology

Sheehan's syndrome, also known as postpartum pituitary gland necrosis, occurs when the pituitary gland is damaged due to significant blood loss and hypovolemic shock (ischemic necrosis) or stroke, originally described during or after childbirth leading to decreased functioning of the pituitary gland (hypopituitarism). Classically, in the milder partial form, the mother is unable to breastfeed her baby, due to failure of the pituitary to secrete the hormone prolactin, and also has no more periods, because FSH (Follicle Stimulating Hormone) and LH (Luteinising Hormone) are not secreted. Although postmenopausal, the mother with this milder form of Sheehan's syndrome does not experience hot flushes, because the pituitary fails to secrete FSH (high levels of FSH are secreted by the pituitary in healthy postmenopausal women in an attempt to trigger ovulation; these high levels of FSH cause the hot flushes).

The syndrome used to be seen as a failure to breastfeed plus amenorrhea (a collection of symptoms), but we now view Sheehan's as the pituitary failing to secrete 1-5 of the 9 hormones that it normally produces. The anterior (front) lobe of the pituitary produces FSH, LH, prolactin, ACTH (adreno-cortico-trophic hormone), TSH (thyroid stimulating hormone) and GH (growth hormone); the posterior pituitary (the lobe at the back) produces ADH (anti-diuretic hormone) and oxytocin. In other words, the pituitary is involved in the regulation of many hormones. It is very important to recognise Sheehan's stroke as, the ACTH deficiency Sheehan's in the presence of the stress of a bacterial infection, such as a urine infection, will result in death of the mother from Addisonian crisis. This gland is located on the under-surface of the brain, the shape of a cherry and the size of a chickpea, and sits in a pit or depression of the sphenoid bone known as the sella turcica (the Turk's saddle).

The pituitary gland works in conjunction with the hypothalamus, and other endocrine organs to modulate numerous bodily functions including growth, metabolism, menstruation, lactation, and even the "fight-or-flight" response. These endocrine organs, (like the thyroid gland in the neck, or adrenals on the upper pole of the kidneys), release hormones in very specific pathways, known as hormonal axes. For example, the release of a hormone in the hypothalamus will target the pituitary to trigger the release thyroid stimulating hormone (TSH), and the pituitary's released hormone (TSH) will target the next organ in the pathway i.e. the thyroid to release thyroxin. Hence, damage to the pituitary gland can have downstream effects on any of the aforementioned bodily functions.

== Signs and symptoms ==
The various signs and symptoms in Sheehan's syndrome are caused by damage to the pituitary, thereby causing a decrease in one or more of the hormones it normally secretes. Since the pituitary controls many glands in the endocrine system, partial or complete loss of a variety of functions may result. Many of the signs and symptoms of Sheehan's are considered "nonspecific" in the medical community; in other words these signs and symptoms are seen in a number of different disease processes, and are not specific to a singular disease or syndrome.

In some cases, a woman with Sheehan syndrome may be relatively asymptomatic initially; therefore, the diagnosis would not be made until years later when features of hypopituitarism become evident. In rare instances this syndrome can present acutely with unstable vital signs, dangerously low blood glucose levels, heart failure, or even psychosis. Hypopituitarism can lead to an interruption in any of the following hormone pathways: thyroid disorder (secondary hypothyroidism), adrenal gland (adrenal insufficiency due to glucocorticoid deficiency), sex hormone (gonadotropin deficiency), prolactin (a hormone responsible for lactation), growth hormone, or rarely anti-diuretic hormone deficiency (central diabetes insipidus). Since damage to the pituitary can cause a deficiency in more than one of these hormone pathways simultaneously, it is possible to have a mix of any of the signs or symptoms listed below.

Sheehan's syndrome's most common initial symptoms are difficulties with or total absence of lactation (agalactorrhea). Another common sign is infrequent menstrual cycles (oligomenorrhea) or absent menstrual cycles (amenorrhea) following delivery. In addition to menstrual irregularities other signs of sex hormone deficiency are hot flashes, decreased libido, and breast involution. Symptoms and signs of thyroid disorder are tiredness, intolerance to cold, constipation, weight gain, hair loss, slowed thinking, as well as a slowed heart rate and low blood pressure. Adrenal gland malfunction can present acutely or chronically. In a more chronic case, it is similar to Addison's disease with symptoms including fatigue, weight loss, hypoglycemia (low blood sugar levels), low hemoglobin levels (anemia) and hyponatremia (low sodium levels) that develop over several months or years. Acute adrenal insufficiency is referred to as an adrenal crisis, which can be life-threatening, and occurs very shortly after the inciting event i.e. significant blood loss post-partum in the context of Sheehan's syndrome. Adrenal crisis signs and symptoms include hypoglycemia, hypotension, weakness, fatigue, and seizures from severe hyponatremia.

Growth hormone deficiency is one of the most common hormone deficiencies of hypopituitarism seen in Sheehan's syndrome. Low levels of growth hormone may present with low energy, body aches, or subtle wrinkling of the skin around the eyes or mouth. The symptoms of anti-diuretic hormone deficiency are increased thirst, excessive urination, headache, and fatigue. Hematological changes might be seen as well such as anemia or low platelets (thrombocytopenia). Hyponatremia is seen in many cases of Sheehan's syndrome because it can result from multiple etiologies. Drops in thyroid hormones and glucocorticoid/adrenal hormones can indirectly lead to hyponatremia through water retention, while blood loss can trigger hyponatremia through ADH secretion. The development of Syndrome of Inappropriate Anti-Diuretic Hormone in patients with Sheehan's syndrome has been documented in the literature, although the mechanism is not well understood.

== Causes ==
As stated, Sheehan's syndrome is caused by damage to the pituitary, thereby causing a decrease in one or more of the hormones it normally secretes. Sheehan's syndrome typically occurs because of excessive blood loss after delivery (post-partum hemorrhage), although there are several risk factors that may contribute to its development. This syndrome does not appear to be exclusively linked to childbirth, as Sheehan's syndrome has been reported in pregnant patients that experienced massive hemorrhage from non-obstetric causes. The pituitary gland grows and has a higher metabolic demand during pregnancy because the pituitary needs to increase the production of hormones associated with pregnancy. This higher metabolic demand, in turn, leads to higher demand for blood flow.

Thus, if the body enters a state of shock from excessive blood loss in post-partum delivery, the pituitary gland is more susceptible to injury. Although the vast majority of cases of Sheehan's syndrome occur in the setting of massive blood loss, cases have been documented of acute Sheehan's syndrome occurring with blood loss volumes that are not considered "massive". Some possible predisposing factors to Sheehan's syndrome may include: disseminated blood coagulation (DIC), hypotension, small sella turcica size, and blood clots from a pre-existing hypercoagulable disorder. Atony of the uterus is a leading cause of post-partum hemorrhage, therefore uterine atony could induce Sheehan's syndrome.

== Pathophysiology ==
This syndrome seems to arise when certain factors compound each other to cause pituitary injury. The physiologic enlargement of the pituitary gland in conjunction with an interference in its blood supply, such as episiotomy progressing to anal tearing, ultimately result in pituitary ischemia and necrosis. One cause of pituitary growth associated with the risk of Sheehan's syndrome is the hyperplasia of lactotrophs which produce prolactin, the hormone responsible for milk production. Other hormone-secreting cells of the pituitary undergo rapid growth in pregnant women as well, which contribute to the gland's enlargement.

The anterior pituitary is supplied by a low pressure portal venous system. The anterior pituitary is more commonly affected in Sheehan's syndrome because of the structure of the portal venous system. Posterior pituitary involvement leading to central diabetes insipidus is much rarer, and typically reflects more extensive damage to the organ and more severe disease. It has been suggested that the arrangement of the pituitary's blood supply contribute to its susceptibility for injury. "The highly vascularized pituitary tissue involves one of the most rapid blood flow in the human body and probably, therefore, has a tendency to infarction because even small degrees of change in the pituitary intravascular pressure cause an arrest of blood flow". Ischemia may occur as a result of vasospasm from shock, hypotension, thrombosis, or direct vascular compression of the hypophyseal artery from the enlarged pituitary gland itself. The presence of disseminated intravascular coagulation (i.e., in amniotic fluid embolism or HELLP syndrome) also appears to be a factor in its development.

== Diagnosis ==
Typically an important clue that leads to a diagnosis of Sheehan's syndrome is identifying a deficiency in one or more of the hormones produced directly, or indirectly, by the pituitary gland. The extent of hormone deficiency, and which hormones are affected depends on the extent of the damage to the pituitary. Hormonal assays measure the levels of these hormones which include but are not limited to T4, TSH, estrogen, gonadotropin, cortisol, and ACTH. It might be difficult to detect damage to these hormone pathways if hormone levels are at the borderline of the abnormal range. In this case, stimulation tests will be done to determine if the pituitary is responsive to hypothalamic hormones.

MRI is useful in diagnosing Sheehan's syndrome since it examines the structure of the pituitary and may identify any anatomical damage. MRI findings will vary based on how early or late in the disease process the test is being conducted. If an MRI is conducted early enough in the disease process the pituitary may appear larger than normal, and show changes that are consistent with damage from lack of blood supply. Later in the disease process of this syndrome the damage imposed on the pituitary gland will cause it to shrink, and leave a partially empty or totally empty sella turcica on MRI.

== Treatment ==
The mainstay of treatment is hormone replacement therapy for the hormones that are missing. Treatment plans and dosages should be individualized by an endocrinologist. Glucocorticoids may be administered to address or prevent an adrenal crisis, a potential serious complication of Sheehan's syndrome. Hormone replacement is vital in reducing the morbidity and mortality of this syndrome.

== Epidemiology ==
The exact prevalence of this syndrome is difficult to define because the incidence varies so much from country to country. Sheehan syndrome is more prevalent in developing countries than developed countries. In a study from the United Kingdom in 2001 only 1.4% of patients with hypopituitarism were diagnosed with Sheehan's syndrome. Just a few years earlier in 1996 the World Health Organization estimated that 3 million women were effected by Sheehan's syndrome. In a study of 1,034 symptomatic adults, Sheehan's syndrome was found to be the sixth-most frequent etiology of growth hormone deficiency, being responsible for 3.1% of cases (versus 53.9% due to a pituitary tumor). Additionally, it was found that the majority of women who experienced Sheehan syndrome gave birth at home rather than in a hospital.

== History ==
The specific association with postpartum shock or hemorrhage was described in 1937 by the British pathologist Harold Leeming Sheehan (1900–1988). The initial distinction was made in the research article "Post-Partum Necrosis of the Anterior Pituitary". In his research, Dr. Sheehan reviewed (through autopsy) the effects of pituitary necrosis on 12 cases of patients that experienced postpartum necrosis. He observed cases where lesions and death occurred during or after pregnancy, as well as cases where death occurred in the late stage of necrosis (years later). This started the initial distinction of Sheehan's syndrome from Simmonds' disease (also known as hypopituitarism). Sheehan noted that significant feature of these patients' cases was hemorrhaging, which in his experience was most commonly caused by either: placenta Previa (low placenta), uterine rupture, cervical or uterine tears, post-partum atony, or retained placenta. Simmonds' disease, however, occurs in either sex due to causes unrelated to pregnancy.

However, in his 1939 publication, "Simmonds' Disease due to Post-partum Necrosis of the Anterior Pituitary", Sheehan displays post-partum necrosis as a cause of Simmonds' disease, thus establishing the relationship between the two conditions. According to Sheehan in 1939 approximately 41% of survivors of severe postpartum hemorrhage (PPH) and/or hypovolemic shock experienced severe or partial hypopituitarism.

== Society and culture ==
In the developed world Sheehan's Syndrome is a rare complication of pregnancy; although this syndrome is more prevalent in developing countries it continues to affect women around the world. A retrospective study in Turkey found that the prevalence of Sheehan's syndrome was directly proportional to the amount of at-home deliveries each decade. This may be due to previously limited obstetric techniques present in a home environment. Blood loss associated with episiotomy and forceps exacerbating blood loss when the placenta separates from the wall of the uterus, particularly in mothers with low blood pressure, even in obstetric setting, namely hospital, caused a more subtle Sheehan's syndrome of Growth Hormone, Anti-Duretic Hormone, ACTH deficiency, which may be life threatening if missed; PubMed.gov Sheehan's in modern times:a nationwide retrospective study Iceland 2011, where every mother gives birth in hospital, with full obstetric care available.

== Research ==
At present, the part that autoimmunity plays in the development of Sheehan's syndrome is uncertain. Several case reports have identified anti-pituitary antibodies in patients diagnosed with Sheehan's. Some patients also tested positive for anti-hypothalamus antibodies. Given that many patients that have developed Sheehan's syndrome do not have detectable levels of these antibodies, it is unclear whether these antibodies cause this syndrome or result from it.
