= POU2AF1 =

Protein-coding gene in the species Homo sapiens

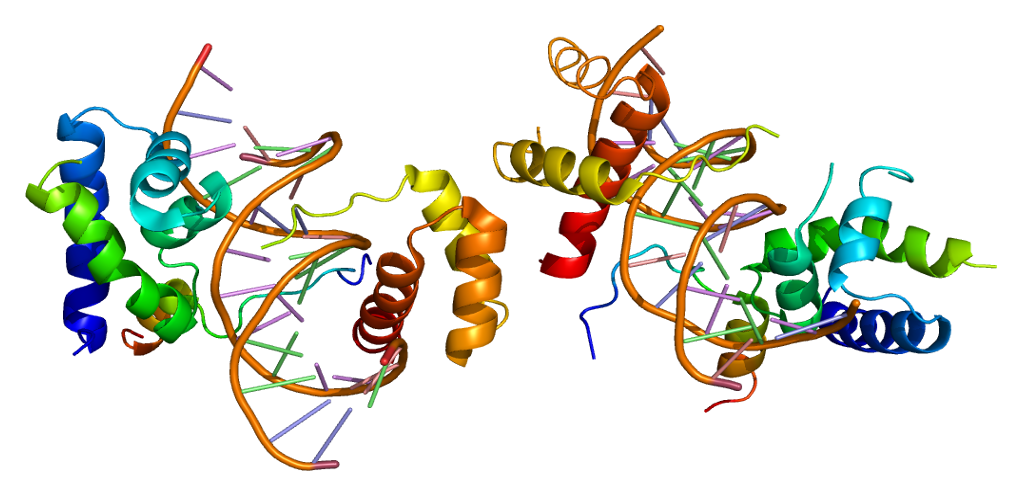
Available structures
PDB	Ortholog search: PDBe RCSB
PDB	List of PDB id codes 1CQT

Identifiers
- Aliases: POU2AF1, BOB1, OBF-1, OBF1, OCAB, POU class 2 associating factor 1, POU class 2 homeobox associating factor 1
- External IDs: OMIM: 601206; MGI: 105086; HomoloGene: 4543; GeneCards: POU2AF1; OMA:POU2AF1 - orthologs

Gene location (Human)
Chr.	Chromosome 11 (human)
Band	11q23.1	Start	111,352,255 bp
Band	11q23.1	End	111,455,630 bp

Gene location (Mouse)
Chr.	Chromosome 9 (mouse)
Band	9|9 A5.3	Start	51,125,008 bp
Band	9|9 A5.3	End	51,151,380 bp
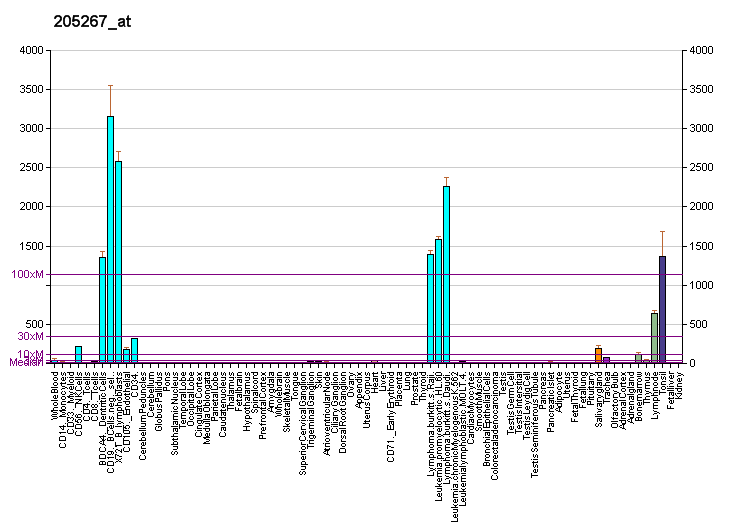
RNA expression pattern
Bgee	Human / Mouse (ortholog); Top expressed in: epithelium of nasopharynx; pylorus; cardia; spleen; lymph node; appendix; bronchial epithelial cell; tonsil; bone marrow cells; mucosa of ileum / Top expressed in: spleen; mesenteric lymph nodes; submandibular gland; blood; tibiofemoral joint; female urethra; tunica adventitia of aorta; granulocyte; subcutaneous adipose tissue; duodenum; More reference expression data
BioGPS	More reference expression data
Gene ontology
Molecular function	DNA binding; transcription coactivator activity; protein binding; transcription coregulator activity; RNA polymerase II core promoter sequence-specific DNA binding; RNA polymerase II cis-regulatory region sequence-specific DNA binding
Cellular component	nucleus; RNA polymerase II transcription regulator complex
Biological process	regulation of transcription, DNA-templated; humoral immune response; transcription by RNA polymerase II; transcription, DNA-templated; positive regulation of transcription by RNA polymerase II
Sources:Amigo / QuickGO
Orthologs
Species	Human	Mouse
Entrez	5450	18985
Ensembl	ENSG00000110777	ENSMUSG00000032053
UniProt	Q16633	Q64693
RefSeq (mRNA)	NM_006235	NM_011136
RefSeq (protein)	NP_006226	NP_035266
Location (UCSC)	Chr 11: 111.35 – 111.46 Mb	Chr 9: 51.13 – 51.15 Mb
PubMed search
- Wikidata
View/Edit Human	View/Edit Mouse

POU domain class 2-associating factor 1 is a protein that in humans is encoded by the POU2AF1 gene. The protein is also termed Oct coactivator from B cells (i.e. OCAB), Oct binding factor 1 (OBF1 or OBF-1), and, as commonly found in the literature, BOB1. BOB1 is a transcriptional coactivator (i.e. a protein that controls the activity of transcription factors) which is expressed principally by B-cell lymphocytes and controls immunoglobulin and other genes critical for these cells expression of CD20, CRISP-3, and CD36. The expression of BOB1 has proven useful for identifying certain lymphomas as being B-cell lymphomas, as exemplified in studies which use BOB1 expression to help identify lymphomas as being diffuse large B-cell lymphomas, not otherwise specified.

== Interactions ==
POU2AF1 has been shown to interact with:

- POU2F1 and
- SIAH1.

== See also ==
- POU domain
- POU domain class 2 transcription factors:
  - POU2F1, POU2F2, POU2F3
