= POU4F1 =

Protein-coding gene in the species Homo sapiens

Identifiers
- Aliases: POU4F1, BRN3A, Oct-T1, RDC-1, brn-3A, POU class 4 homeobox 1, ATITHS
- External IDs: OMIM: 601632; MGI: 102525; GeneCards: POU4F1

Gene location (Human)
Chr.	Chromosome 13 (human)
Band	13q31.1	Start	78,598,362 bp
Band	13q31.1	End	78,603,552 bp
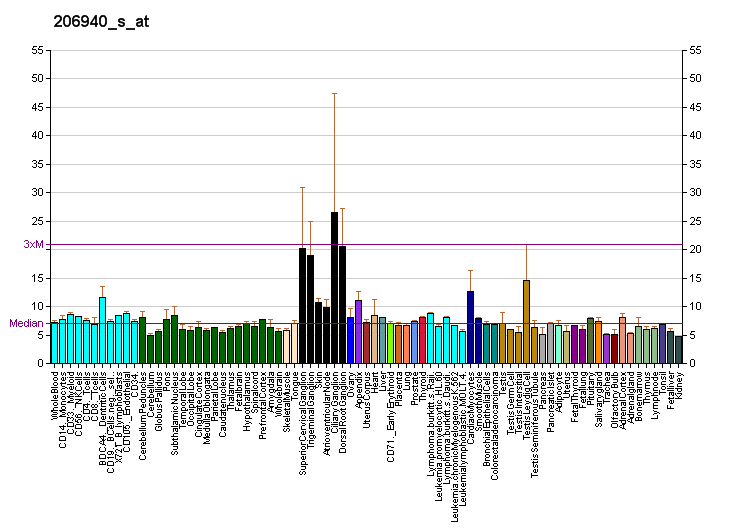

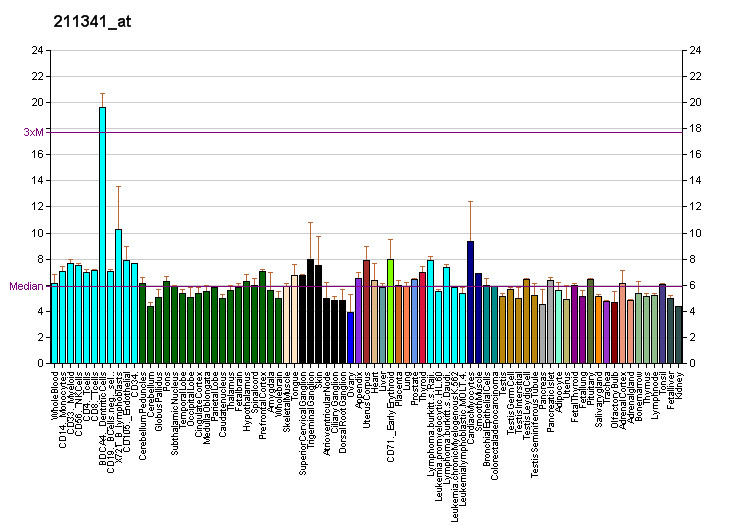
RNA expression pattern
Bgee	Human / Mouse (ortholog); Top expressed in: secondary oocyte; spinal ganglia; testicle; trigeminal ganglion; buccal mucosa cell; gonad; tibialis anterior muscle; pancreatic ductal cell; medulla oblongata; deltoid muscle / n/a; More reference expression data
BioGPS	More reference expression data
Gene ontology
Molecular function	RNA polymerase II cis-regulatory region sequence-specific DNA binding; DNA binding; DNA-binding transcription factor activity; DNA-binding transcription activator activity, RNA polymerase II-specific; transcription factor activity, RNA polymerase II distal enhancer sequence-specific binding; chromatin binding; single-stranded DNA binding; sequence-specific DNA binding; GTPase binding; transcription coactivator activity; transcription corepressor activity; DNA-binding transcription factor activity, RNA polymerase II-specific
Cellular component	neuron projection; nucleoplasm; nucleus; cytoplasm
Biological process	peripheral nervous system neuron development; regulation of transcription, DNA-templated; habenula development; axonogenesis; trigeminal nerve development; neuron fate specification; ventricular compact myocardium morphogenesis; cell migration in hindbrain; negative regulation of apoptotic process; negative regulation of transcription by RNA polymerase II; transcription by RNA polymerase II; transcription, DNA-templated; nervous system development; multicellular organism development; negative regulation of transcription elongation by RNA polymerase I; central nervous system neuron differentiation; neuron differentiation; positive regulation of apoptotic process; synapse assembly; peripheral nervous system neuron differentiation; mesoderm development; innervation; proprioception involved in equilibrioception; regulation of neurogenesis; sensory system development; suckling behavior; regulation of signal transduction by p53 class mediator; positive regulation of gene expression; neuron projection development; negative regulation of neuron apoptotic process; positive regulation of transcription by RNA polymerase II; negative regulation of programmed cell death; positive regulation of osteoclast differentiation; regulation of DNA-binding transcription factor activity; cellular response to cytokine stimulus; cellular response to estradiol stimulus; intrinsic apoptotic signaling pathway by p53 class mediator; positive regulation of transcription regulatory region DNA binding; development of the heart; negative regulation of gene expression
Sources:Amigo / QuickGO
Orthologs
Databases	NCBI: entry; OMA: entry
Species	Human	Mouse
Entrez	5457	18996
Ensembl	ENSG00000152192	ENSMUSG00000048349
UniProt	Q01851	P17208
RefSeq (mRNA)	NM_006237	NM_011143
RefSeq (protein)	NP_006228	NP_035273
Location (UCSC)	Chr 13: 78.6 – 78.6 Mb	n/a
PubMed search
- Wikidata
View/Edit Human	View/Edit Mouse

POU domain, class 4, transcription factor 1 (POU4F1) also known as brain-specific homeobox/POU domain protein 3A (BRN3A), homeobox/POU domain protein RDC-1 or Oct-T1 is a protein that in humans is encoded by the POU4F1 gene.

BRN3A (POU4F1) is a class IV POU domain-containing transcription factor highly expressed in the developing peripheral sensory nervous system (dorsal root ganglia, trigeminal ganglion, and hindbrain sensory ganglia), certain regions of the central nervous system, retinal neurons called ganglion cells, and in cells of the B- and T-lymphocytic lineages.

== Discovery ==
Brn3a was initially discovered in mice based on homology to the prototypal POU transcription factors Pit1 (Pituitary-specific positive transcription factor 1, Pou1f1), Oct1 (Pou2f1), and the Caenorhabditis elegans factor Unc86, and named Brn3. When multiple members of the Brn3 gene class were discovered, it was renamed Brn3.0 and Brn3a by different groups of researchers. Subsequently, the gene was systematically renamed Pou4f1 in mice and POU4F1 in humans. The protein product is still frequently referred to as Brn3a.

== Function ==
In addition to sensory neurons, in rodents and birds (and presumably humans) Brn3a is expressed in multiple sites in the central nervous system, including the spinal cord, midbrain superior colliculus, red nucleus, nucleus ambiguus, inferior olivary nucleus, habenula, and retina.

Mice with null mutations ("knockouts") in Brn3a die at birth, due to developmental defects in the nucleus ambiguus, which is essential for respiration.

Brn3a is a transcription factor which acts in development by regulating downstream "target" genes. Microarrays have been used to determine many genes downstream of Brn3a in peripheral sensory neurons.

In the sensory neurons Brn3a is co-expressed with the LIM domain transcription factor ISL1 or Islet1, and has many downstream targets in common with Isl1. Pou4f1/Isl1 double mutant mice show strong epistatic effects in regulation of many downstream genes in the sensory neurons of double mutant mouse embryos.

Although the homozygous Brn3a null mutation is lethal at birth in mice, Brn3a null heterozygotes have no known phenotype. i.e. the Brn3a null mutation is completely recessive. This can be explained by gene dosage compensation due to autoregulation, in which expression of the remaining copy of the Pou4f1 gene is increased in heterozygotes, leading to near-normal expression of its downstream targets. The combination of homozygote lethality and dosage compensation in heterozygotes may explain why POU4F1 mutations have not been identified in any human disease, whereas diseases are associated with several other members of the POU domain transcription factor class.

== Interactions ==
POU4F1 has been shown to interact with Estrogen receptor alpha, RIT2 and Ewing sarcoma breakpoint region 1.

== See also ==
- BRN-3
- POU4F1 movement disorder Home | POU4F1 Foundation, Inc.
