= NPAT =

NPAT or Npat may refer to:

- NPAT (gene)
- National Political Awareness Test
- Net profit after tax
