= POU domain =

Protein family

Pou domain - N-terminal to homeobox domain

Identifiers
- Symbol: Pou
- Pfam: PF00157
- InterPro: IPR000327
- PROSITE: PDOC00035
- SCOP2: 1oct / SCOPe / SUPFAM
Available protein structures:
- PDB: IPR000327 PF00157 (ECOD; PDBsum)
- AlphaFold: IPR000327; PF00157

POU (pronounced 'pow') is a family of eukaryotic transcription factors that have well-conserved homeodomains. The Pou domain is a bipartite DNA binding domain found in these proteins.

== Etymology ==
The acronym POU is derived from the names of three transcription factors:

- the Pituitary-specific Pit-1
- the Octamer transcription factor proteins Oct-1 and Oct-2 (octamer sequence is ATGCAAAT)
- the neural Unc-86 transcription factor from Caenorhabditis elegans.

== Diversity ==
POU domain genes have been described in organisms as divergent as Caenorhabditis elegans, Drosophila, Xenopus, zebrafish and human but have not been yet identified in plants and fungi.

Comparisons of POU domain genes across the animals suggests that the family can be divided into six major classes (POU1-POU6). Pit-1 is part of the POU1 class, Oct-1 and Oct-2 are members of POU2, while Unc-86 is a member of POU4. The six classes diverged early in animal evolution: POU1, POU3, POU4, and POU6 classes evolved before the last common ancestor of sponges and eumetazoans, POU2 evolved in the Bilatera, and POU5 appears to be unique to vertebrates.

There is a surprisingly high degree of amino acid sequence conservation (37%-42%) of POU homeodomains to the transcriptional regulator comS, the competence protein from the gram positive prokaryote Bacillus subtilis. Akin to the way that POU homeodomain regulators lead to tissue differentiation in metazoans, this transcription factor is critical for differentiation of a subpopulation of B. subtilis into a state of genetic competence.

== Function ==
POU proteins are eukaryotic transcription factors containing a bipartite DNA binding domain referred to as the POU domain. The various members of the POU family have a wide variety of functions, all of which are related to the function of the neuroendocrine system and the development of an organism. Some other genes are also regulated, including those for immunoglobulin light and heavy chains (Oct-2), and trophic hormone genes, such as those for prolactin and growth hormone (Pit-1).

== Structure ==
The POU domain is a bipartite domain composed of two subunits separated by a non-conserved region of 15-55 aa. The N-terminal subunit is known as the POU-specific (POUs) domain (InterPro: IPR000327), while the C-terminal subunit is a homeobox domain (InterPro: IPR007103). 3D structures of complexes including both POU subdomains bound to DNA are available. Both subdomains contain the structural motif 'helix-turn-helix', which directly associates with the two components of bipartite DNA binding sites, and both are required for high affinity sequence-specific DNA-binding. The domain may also be involved in protein-protein interactions. The subdomains are connected by a flexible linker. In proteins a POU-specific domain is always accompanied by a homeodomain. Despite the lack of sequence homology, 3D structure of POUs is similar to 3D structure of bacteriophage lambda repressor and other members of HTH_3 family.

== Examples ==
Human genes encoding proteins containing the POU domain and related pseudogenes include:

- HDX;
- POU1F1;
- POU2F1; POU2F2; POU2F3;
- POU3F1; POU3F2; POU3F3; POU3F4;
- POU4F1; POU4F2; POU4F3;
- POU5F1; POU5F1B; POU5F1P2; POU5F1P3; POU5F1P4; POU5F1P5; POU5F1P6; POU5F1P7;
- POU5F2;
- POU6F1; POU6F2
