= Liebenberg syndrome =

Human disease

- Other names: Brachydactyly-elbow wrist dysplasia syndrome
- Frequency: 0.0001%

Liebenberg syndrome is a rare autosomal genetic disease that involves a deletion mutation upstream of the PITX1 gene, one that is responsible for the body's organization, specifically in forming lower limbs. In animal studies, when this deletion was introduced to developing birds, their wing buds were noted to take on limb-like structures.

The condition was first described by Dr. F. Liebenberg in 1973 while he followed multiple generations of a South African family, but it has since been noticed in other family lineages across the world.

== Symptoms and signs ==
Liebenberg syndrome is characterized by three main symptoms:

1. Dysplasia (improper formation) of the bony components of the elbow
2. Abnormal shape of carpal bones
3. Brachydactyly, a symptom where the fingers and toes are shorter than normal.

=== Phenotype ===
People with Liebenberg syndrome have normal overall body structure. Their morphological differences are in both of their distal humeri, elbows, hands and wrists. The elbows are enlarged with abnormally large olecranons and radial heads. Patients have relatively fixed elbow positions and are therefore unable to pronate or supinate their forearms. Their wrists are also limited in their active movements and have very prominent ulnar sides of the joints. The fingers adopt toe-like structures. Brachydactyly and camptodactyly occur; fingers are short and abnormally bent. These changes in finger shape result in small club shaped appendages. Motion is reduced in all digital joints of the hand.

== Genetics ==
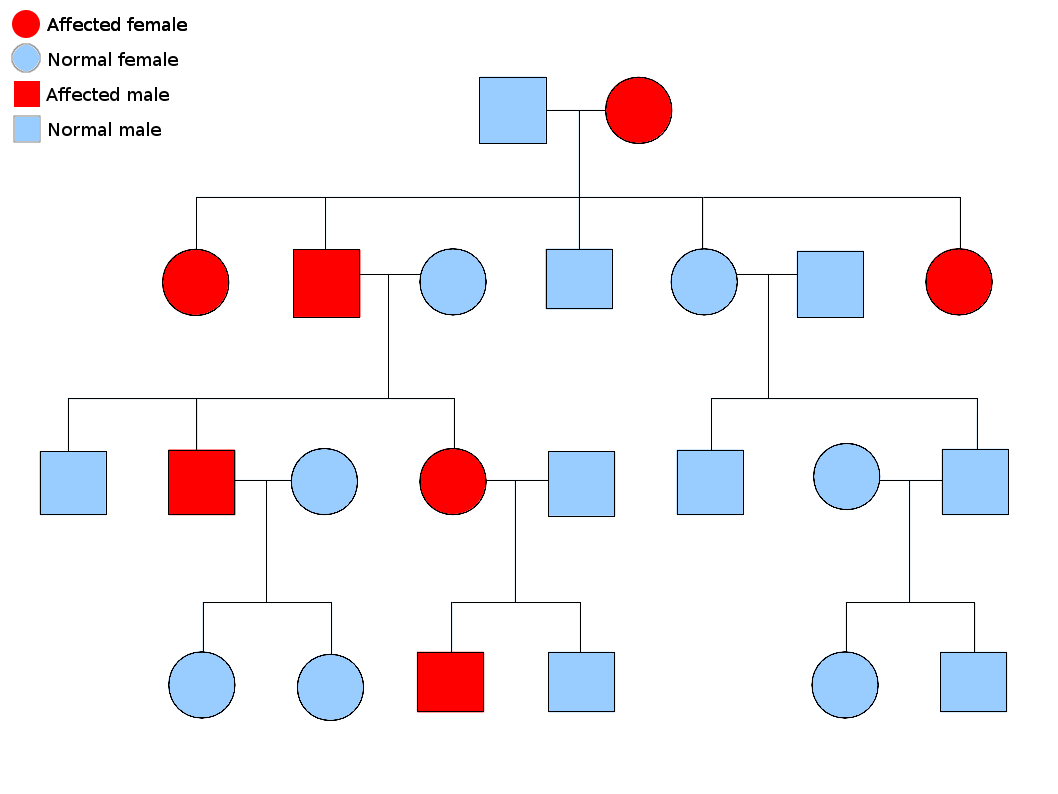
Example of autosomal dominant inheritance

Liebenberg syndrome follows an autosomal dominant mode of inheritance, whereby heterozygotes with this mutation express the disease phenotype.

It is caused by a heterozygous mutation to chromosome 5. It involves the inappropriate enhancement of the PITX1 gene due to genetic deletions and chromosome translocations.

PITX1 is a homeobox gene which are genes that regulate proper body structure development. This PT1X gene encodes a transcription factor expressed in hind limbs. When expressed, it causes the formation of hindlimb structures.

Liebenberg syndrome is the result of one of two different genetic mutations. The first is a deletion upstream of the PITX1 gene on chromosome 5. This deletion includes the H2AFY gene, which is responsible for suppressing an upstream enhancer element known as hs1473. When H2AFY is removed, the enhancer is brought closer to PITX1 and inappropriately enhances it in forelimbs, causing them to adopt hindlimb morphology.

The second mutation that can cause the phenotype for Liebenberg syndrome is a translocation of chromosome 18 and chromosome 5. Translocation mutations are ones that switch parts of non-homologous chromosomes with each other. This move introduces two enhancers from chromosome 18 to move to a position directly upstream of PITX1 on chromosome 5. The enhancers increase transcription of the PITX1 gene and cause patients to develop the same phenotype described above.

== Treatment ==
Surgery is an option to correct some of the morphological changes made by Liebenberg syndrome. Cases exist where surgery is performed to correct radial deviations and flexion deformities in the wrist. A surgery called a carpectomy has been performed on a patient whereby a surgeon removes the proximal row of the carpal bones. This procedure removes some of the carpal bones to create a more regular wrist function than is observed in people with this condition.
