= PITX1 =

Protein-coding gene in humans

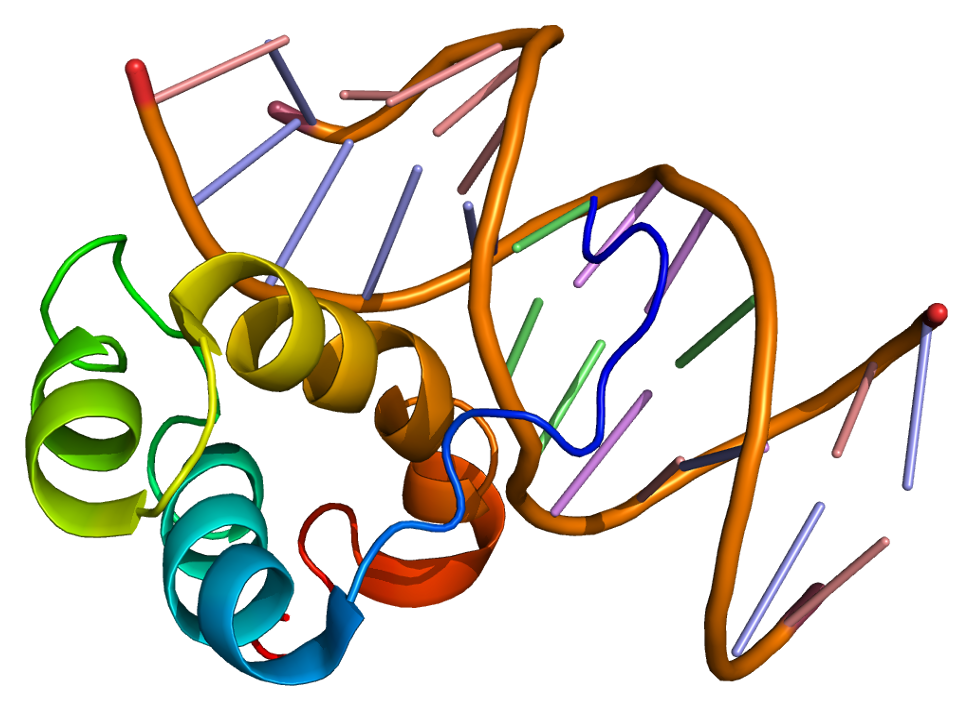

Identifiers
- Aliases: PITX1, BFT, CCF, LBNBG, POTX, PTX1, paired like homeodomain 1
- External IDs: OMIM: 602149; MGI: 107374; GeneCards: PITX1

Gene location (Human)
Chr.	Chromosome 5 (human)
Band	5q31.1	Start	135,027,734 bp
Band	5q31.1	End	135,034,813 bp

Gene location (Mouse)
Chr.	Chromosome 13 (mouse)
Band	13 B1|13 30.06 cM	Start	55,972,864 bp
Band	13 B1|13 30.06 cM	End	55,984,005 bp
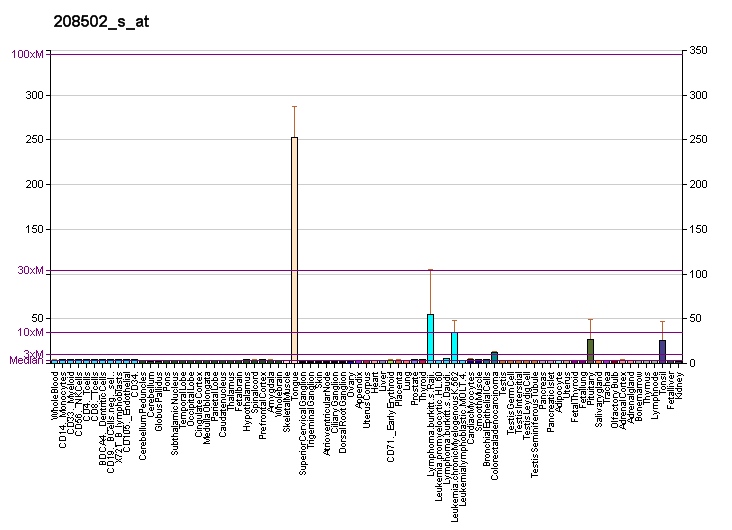

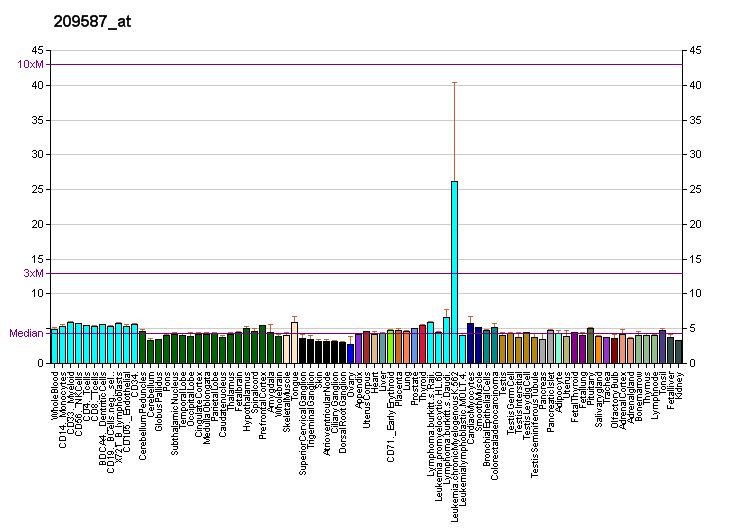
RNA expression pattern
Bgee	Human / Mouse (ortholog); Top expressed in: mucosa of pharynx; pituitary gland; oral mucosa; minor salivary glands; anterior pituitary; gums; gingival epithelium; gastric mucosa; muscle of thigh; olfactory zone of nasal mucosa / Top expressed in: oral mucosa; wall of esophagus; mucosa of esophagus; epithelium of esophagus; Rathke's pouch; mandibular prominence; yolk sac; mandible; submandibular gland; muscle of anterior abdominal wall; More reference expression data
BioGPS	More reference expression data
Gene ontology
Molecular function	DNA binding; sequence-specific DNA binding; DNA-binding transcription activator activity, RNA polymerase II-specific; RNA polymerase II cis-regulatory region sequence-specific DNA binding; protein binding; DNA-binding transcription factor activity; DNA-binding transcription factor activity, RNA polymerase II-specific
Cellular component	cytoplasm; transcription regulator complex; nucleolus; nucleus
Biological process	skeletal system development; pituitary gland development; regulation of transcription, DNA-templated; anatomical structure morphogenesis; transcription by RNA polymerase II; hindlimb morphogenesis; transcription, DNA-templated; multicellular organism development; cartilage development; myoblast fate commitment; negative regulation of transcription, DNA-templated; branchiomeric skeletal muscle development; positive regulation of transcription by RNA polymerase II; embryonic hindlimb morphogenesis
Sources:Amigo / QuickGO
Orthologs
Databases	NCBI: entry; OMA: entry
Species	Human	Mouse
Entrez	5307	18740
Ensembl	ENSG00000069011	ENSMUSG00000021506
UniProt	P78337	P70314
RefSeq (mRNA)	NM_002653	NM_011097
RefSeq (protein)	NP_002644	NP_035227
Location (UCSC)	Chr 5: 135.03 – 135.03 Mb	Chr 13: 55.97 – 55.98 Mb
PubMed search
- Wikidata
View/Edit Human	View/Edit Mouse

Paired-like homeodomain 1 is a protein that in humans is encoded by the PITX1 gene.

== Function ==
This gene encodes a member of the RIEG/PITX homeobox family, which is in the bicoid class of homeodomain proteins. Members of this family are involved in organ development and left-right asymmetry. This protein acts as a transcriptional regulator involved in basal and hormone-regulated activity of prolactin.

== Clinical relevance ==
Mutations in this gene have been associated with autism, club foot and polydactyly in humans.

== Genetic basis of pathologies ==
Genomic rearrangements at the PITX1 locus are associated with Liebenberg syndrome. In PITX1 Liebenberg is associated with a translocation or deletions, which cause insert promoter groups into the PITX1 locus. A missense mutation within the PITX1 locus is associated with the development of autosomal dominant clubfoot.

== Interactions ==
PITX1 has been shown to interact with pituitary-specific positive transcription factor 1.
