= POU4F2 =

Protein-coding gene in the species Homo sapiens

Identifiers
- Aliases: POU4F2, BRN3.2, BRN3B, Brn-3b, POU class 4 homeobox 2
- External IDs: OMIM: 113725; MGI: 102524; GeneCards: POU4F2

Gene location (Human)
Chr.	Chromosome 4 (human)
Band	4q31.22	Start	146,638,893 bp
Band	4q31.22	End	146,642,474 bp
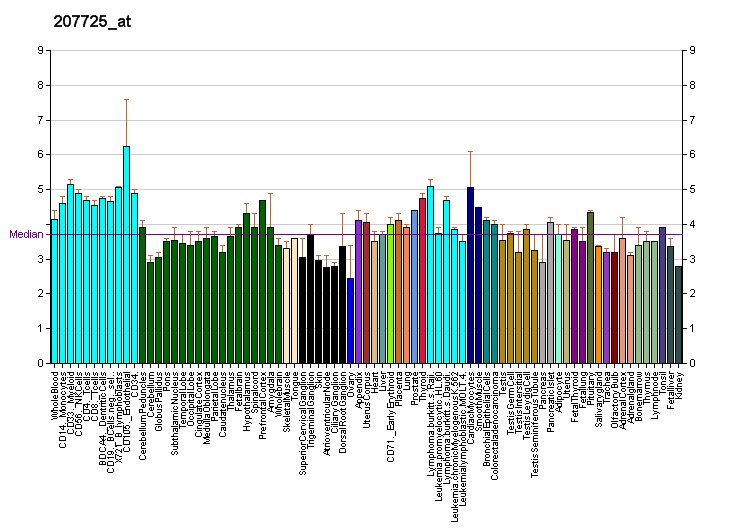
RNA expression pattern
Bgee	Human / Mouse (ortholog); Top expressed in: secondary oocyte; pons; pancreatic ductal cell; mucosa of ileum; sensory ganglion; trigeminal ganglion; ventral tegmental area; medulla oblongata; pars compacta; superior vestibular nucleus / Top expressed in: lumbar spinal ganglion; trigeminal ganglion; superior colliculus; morula; otolith organ; inferior colliculi; utricle; ganglion cell layer; embryo; pontine nuclei; More reference expression data
BioGPS	More reference expression data
Gene ontology
Molecular function	DNA binding; sequence-specific DNA binding; DNA-binding transcription factor activity; DNA-binding transcription activator activity, RNA polymerase II-specific; chromatin binding; RNA polymerase II cis-regulatory region sequence-specific DNA binding; DNA-binding transcription repressor activity, RNA polymerase II-specific; transcription coactivator activity; transcription corepressor activity; promoter-specific chromatin binding; DNA-binding transcription factor activity, RNA polymerase II-specific; p53 binding
Cellular component	nucleoplasm; nucleus; nuclear speck; cytoplasm; plasma membrane; membrane; transcription regulator complex
Biological process	regulation of transcription, DNA-templated; axonogenesis; neuromuscular process controlling balance; hearing; transcription, DNA-templated; MAPK cascade; axon guidance; retina development in camera-type eye; positive regulation of cell differentiation; spermatogenesis; neuron differentiation; axon extension; intracellular estrogen receptor signaling pathway; retinal ganglion cell axon guidance; regulation of signal transduction by p53 class mediator; transcription by RNA polymerase II; negative regulation of DNA-binding transcription factor activity; positive regulation of transcription by RNA polymerase II; positive regulation of programmed cell death; negative regulation of cell differentiation; positive regulation of osteoclast differentiation; positive regulation of axon extension; regulation of DNA-binding transcription factor activity; cellular response to cytokine stimulus; cellular response to estradiol stimulus; intrinsic apoptotic signaling pathway by p53 class mediator; regulation of retinal ganglion cell axon guidance; negative regulation of amacrine cell differentiation; dorsal root ganglion development; positive regulation of transcription regulatory region DNA binding; apoptotic process; multicellular organism development; cell differentiation; negative regulation of transcription by RNA polymerase II; development of the heart; regulation of gene expression; positive regulation of cardiac muscle cell apoptotic process; cellular response to insulin stimulus; positive regulation of glucose import; cellular response to oxygen levels; negative regulation of adipose tissue development
Sources:Amigo / QuickGO
Orthologs
Databases	NCBI: entry; OMA: entry
Species	Human	Mouse
Entrez	5458	18997
Ensembl	ENSG00000151615	ENSMUSG00000031688
UniProt	Q12837	Q63934
RefSeq (mRNA)	NM_004575	NM_138944
RefSeq (protein)	NP_004566	NP_620394
Location (UCSC)	Chr 4: 146.64 – 146.64 Mb	n/a
PubMed search
- Wikidata
View/Edit Human	View/Edit Mouse

POU domain, class 4, transcription factor 2 is a protein that in humans is encoded by the POU4F2 gene.

== Function ==
POU4F2 is a member of the POU-domain family of transcription factors. POU-domain proteins have been observed to play important roles in control of cell identity in several systems. A class IV POU-domain protein, POU4F2 is found in human retina exclusively within a subpopulation of ganglion cells where it may play a role in determining or maintaining the identities of a small subset of visual system neurons.[supplied by OMIM]

== Interactions ==
POU4F2 has been shown to interact with Estrogen receptor alpha.

== See also ==
- BRN-3
