= BRN-3 =

Protein family

POU class 4 homeobox 1

Identifiers
- Symbol: POU4F1
- Alt. symbols: BRN3A
- NCBI gene: 5457
- HGNC: 9218
- OMIM: 601632
- RefSeq: NM_006237
- UniProt: Q01851

Other data
- Locus: Chr. 13 q31.1
Search for
- Structures: Swiss-model
- Domains: InterPro

POU class 4 homeobox 2

Identifiers
- Symbol: POU4F2
- Alt. symbols: BRN3B
- NCBI gene: 5458
- HGNC: 9219
- OMIM: 113725
- RefSeq: NM_004575
- UniProt: Q12837

Other data
- Locus: Chr. 4 q31.22
Search for
- Structures: Swiss-model
- Domains: InterPro

POU class 4 homeobox 3

Identifiers
- Symbol: POU4F3
- Alt. symbols: BRN3C, DFNA15
- NCBI gene: 5459
- HGNC: 9220
- OMIM: 602460
- RefSeq: NM_002700
- UniProt: Q15319

Other data
- Locus: Chr. 5 q32
Search for
- Structures: Swiss-model
- Domains: InterPro

BRN-3 is a group of related transcription factors in the POU family. They are also known as class 4 POU domain homeobox proteins.

There are three BRN-3 proteins encoded by the following genes:

- BRN3A (POU4F1, POU4F1)
- BRN3B (POU4F2, POU4F2)
- BRN3C (POU4F3, POU4F3)

== Nomenclature ==
The BRN or Brn prefix is an abbreviation for "brain"; the longer name is "Brain-specific homeobox". The name of the group may also be abbreviated as POU4, Pou4, POU IV, or POU-IV.
