= HOXC13 =

Protein-coding gene in humans

Identifiers
- Aliases: HOXC13, ECTD9, HOX3, HOX3G, homeobox C13
- External IDs: OMIM: 142976; MGI: 99560; GeneCards: HOXC13

Gene location (Human)
Chr.	Chromosome 12 (human)
Band	12q13.13	Start	53,938,831 bp
Band	12q13.13	End	53,946,544 bp

Gene location (Mouse)
Chr.	Chromosome 15 (mouse)
Band	15 F3|15 57.99 cM	Start	102,829,538 bp
Band	15 F3|15 57.99 cM	End	102,837,249 bp
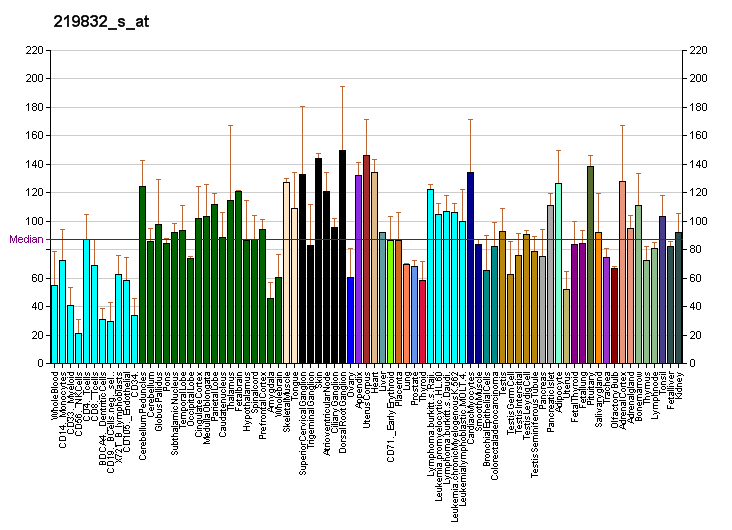
RNA expression pattern
Bgee	Human / Mouse (ortholog); Top expressed in: hair follicle; gonad; testicle; skin of arm; skin of leg; skin of abdomen; placenta; popliteal artery; tibial arteries; breast / Top expressed in: lip; hair follicle; filiform papilla; tail of embryo; skin of back; skin of abdomen; genital tubercle; blastocyst; stroma of bone marrow; morula; More reference expression data
BioGPS	More reference expression data
Gene ontology
Molecular function	sequence-specific DNA binding; DNA binding; DNA-binding transcription activator activity, RNA polymerase II-specific; chromatin binding; protein binding; DNA-binding transcription factor activity, RNA polymerase II-specific
Cellular component	nucleus
Biological process	hair follicle development; multicellular organism development; nail development; regulation of transcription, DNA-templated; transcription by RNA polymerase II; transcription, DNA-templated; anterior/posterior pattern specification; tongue morphogenesis; positive regulation of transcription by RNA polymerase II; anatomical structure morphogenesis
Sources:Amigo / QuickGO
Orthologs
Databases	NCBI: entry; OMA: entry
Species	Human	Mouse
Entrez	3229	15422
Ensembl	ENSG00000123364	ENSMUSG00000001655
UniProt	P31276	P50207
RefSeq (mRNA)	NM_017410	NM_010464
RefSeq (protein)	NP_059106	NP_034594
Location (UCSC)	Chr 12: 53.94 – 53.95 Mb	Chr 15: 102.83 – 102.84 Mb
PubMed search
- Wikidata
View/Edit Human	View/Edit Mouse

Homeobox protein Hox-C13 is a protein that in humans is encoded by the HOXC13 gene.

== Structure ==
This gene belongs to the homeobox family of genes. The homeobox genes encode a highly conserved family of transcription factors that play an important role in morphogenesis in all multicellular organisms. Mammals possess four similar homeobox gene clusters, HOXA, HOXB, HOXC and HOXD, which are located on different chromosomes and consist of 9 to 11 genes arranged in tandem. This gene is one of several homeobox HOXC genes located in a cluster on chromosome 12.

HOXC13 is positioned toward the 5' end of the HOXC cluster.

== Function ==
The product of this gene may play a role in the development of hair, nail, and filiform papilla.

HOX gene expression follows a principle called collinearity: genes at the 3' end are expressed earlier and more anteriorly, while those at the 5' end are expressed in more posterior or distal structures. As a result, the HOXC13 gene is primarily involved in the development and differentiation of ectodermal structures rather than early axial patterning.

== Clinical significance ==
Mutations in HOXC13 can lead to disruptions in the transcription factors the gene is associated with, particularly being linked to Pure hair-nail type ectodermal dysplasia. Research suggests that disruptions in mRNA decay are the root cause of a failure to properly develop hair follicles, nails, sebaceous glands, and other ectodermal structures. These effects are a result of a nonsense mutation in HOXC13 that codes for a protein without a C-terminal homeodomain and undergoes total loss-of-function. The mutation has no effects on any other organ systems and is limited to ectodermal structures.

== See also ==
- Homeobox
