= RIT2 =

Protein-coding gene in humans

Identifiers
- Aliases: RIT2, RIBA, RIN, ROC2, Ras like without CAAX 2
- External IDs: OMIM: 609592; MGI: 108054; GeneCards: RIT2
Enzyme activity
EC #	BRENDA	ExPASy	KEGG	MetaCyc
3.6.5.2	↗	↗	↗	↗

Gene location (Human)
Chr.	Chromosome 18 (human)
Band	18q12.3	Start	42,743,227 bp
Band	18q12.3	End	43,115,691 bp

Gene location (Mouse)
Chr.	Chromosome 18 (mouse)
Band	18|18 B1	Start	31,106,542 bp
Band	18|18 B1	End	31,450,343 bp
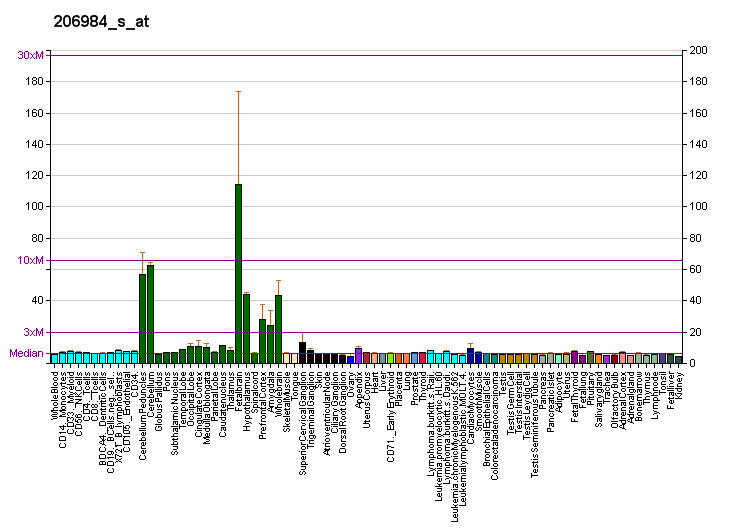
RNA expression pattern
Bgee	Human / Mouse (ortholog); Top expressed in: cerebellar cortex; cerebellar hemisphere; right hemisphere of cerebellum; cerebellar vermis; endothelial cell; Brodmann area 9; prefrontal cortex; nucleus accumbens; hypothalamus; right frontal lobe / Top expressed in: ventral tegmental area; dorsal tegmental nucleus; dorsomedial hypothalamic nucleus; medial vestibular nucleus; habenula; suprachiasmatic nucleus; central gray substance of midbrain; paraventricular nucleus of hypothalamus; arcuate nucleus; deep cerebellar nuclei; More reference expression data
BioGPS	More reference expression data
Gene ontology
Molecular function	nucleotide binding; calmodulin binding; identical protein binding; GTP binding; protein binding; semaphorin receptor binding; chromatin binding; GTPase activity; GDP binding
Cellular component	membrane; membrane raft; plasma membrane; nucleus; neuron projection; cytoplasm; cell body; dendritic tree
Biological process	chemical synaptic transmission; signal transduction; MAPK cascade; maintenance of protein location in cell; regulation of endocytosis; intracellular signal transduction; regulation of protein phosphorylation; Ras protein signal transduction; positive regulation of neuron projection development; negative regulation of neuron projection development; regulation of Cdc42 protein signal transduction; positive regulation of MAPK cascade; positive regulation of transcription by RNA polymerase II; regulation of calcium-mediated signaling; small GTPase mediated signal transduction; adenylate cyclase-activating G protein-coupled receptor signaling pathway
Sources:Amigo / QuickGO
Orthologs
Databases	NCBI: entry; OMA: entry
Species	Human	Mouse
Entrez	6014	19762
Ensembl	ENSG00000152214	ENSMUSG00000057455
UniProt	Q99578	P70425
RefSeq (mRNA)	NM_002930; NM_001272077	NM_009065
RefSeq (protein)	NP_001259006; NP_002921	NP_033091
Location (UCSC)	Chr 18: 42.74 – 43.12 Mb	Chr 18: 31.11 – 31.45 Mb
PubMed search
- Wikidata
View/Edit Human	View/Edit Mouse

GTP-binding protein Rit2 is a protein that in humans is encoded by the RIT2 gene.

RIN belongs to the RAS (HRAS; MIM 190020) superfamily of small GTPases (Shao et al., 1999).[supplied by OMIM]

RIT2 has been associated with Parkinson's disease in two large genetic studies. An gene expression study of postmortem brain has suggested RIT2 interacts with interferon-γ signalling.

== Interactions ==
RIT2 has been shown to interact with POU4F1.
