= POU4F3 =

Protein-coding gene in the species Homo sapiens

Identifiers
- Aliases: POU4F3, BRN3C, DFNA15, POU class 4 homeobox 3, DFNA42, DFNA52
- External IDs: OMIM: 602460; MGI: 102523; GeneCards: POU4F3

Gene location (Human)
Chr.	Chromosome 5 (human)
Band	5q32	Start	146,338,839 bp
Band	5q32	End	146,341,728 bp

Gene location (Mouse)
Chr.	Chromosome 18 (mouse)
Band	18 B3|18 22.58 cM	Start	42,527,604 bp
Band	18 B3|18 22.58 cM	End	42,530,314 bp
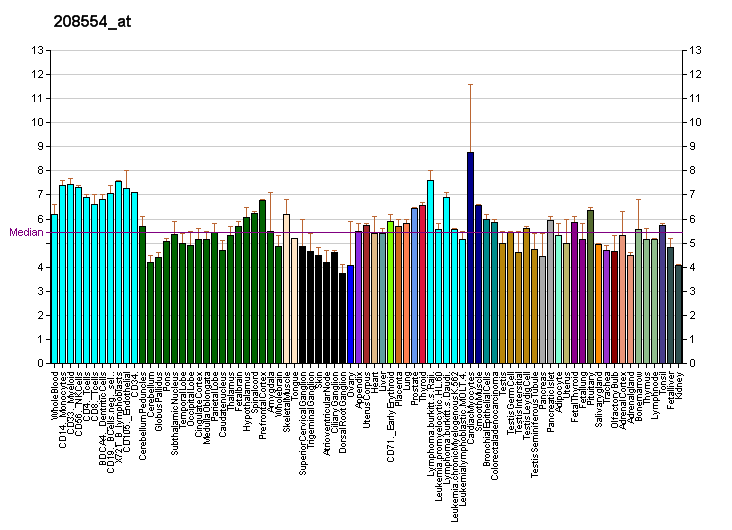
RNA expression pattern
Bgee	Human / Mouse (ortholog); Top expressed in: smooth muscle tissue; tibial arteries; islet of Langerhans; C1 segment / Top expressed in: lumbar spinal ganglion; organ of Corti; embryo; vestibular sensory epithelium; neural layer of retina; otolith organ; utricle; saccule; basal plate; lip; More reference expression data
BioGPS	More reference expression data
Gene ontology
Molecular function	DNA binding; sequence-specific DNA binding; DNA-binding transcription factor activity; DNA-binding transcription activator activity, RNA polymerase II-specific; RNA polymerase II cis-regulatory region sequence-specific DNA binding; DNA-binding transcription factor activity, RNA polymerase II-specific
Cellular component	nucleoplasm; nucleus; cytoplasm
Biological process	regulation of transcription, DNA-templated; hearing; inner ear development; visual perception; transcription by RNA polymerase II; transcription, DNA-templated; cell differentiation; positive regulation of transcription by RNA polymerase II; regulation of transcription by RNA polymerase II; vestibulocochlear nerve development; retinal ganglion cell axon guidance; inner ear morphogenesis; inner ear auditory receptor cell differentiation; axon extension; neuromuscular process controlling balance; neuron apoptotic process; inner ear receptor cell differentiation
Sources:Amigo / QuickGO
Orthologs
Databases	NCBI: entry; OMA: entry
Species	Human	Mouse
Entrez	5459	18998
Ensembl	ENSG00000091010	ENSMUSG00000024497
UniProt	Q15319	Q63955
RefSeq (mRNA)	NM_002700	NM_138945
RefSeq (protein)	NP_002691	NP_620395
Location (UCSC)	Chr 5: 146.34 – 146.34 Mb	Chr 18: 42.53 – 42.53 Mb
PubMed search
- Wikidata
View/Edit Human	View/Edit Mouse

POU domain, class 4, transcription factor 3 is a protein that in humans is encoded by the POU4F3 gene. It's a member of BRN-3 group, also known as POU family class 4.

== Nomenclature ==
DFNA15 refers to a type of nonsyndromic deafness, with autosomal dominant inheritance.
