= Octamer transcription factor =

Group of proteins

Octamer transcription factors are a family of transcription factors which binds to the "ATTTGCAT" DNA sequence. Their DNA-binding domain is a POU domain.

There are eight Octamer proteins in humans (Oct1–11), which have been renamed according to the different classes of POU domain. Octamer-3/4, also known as POU5F1, is one of the Yamanaka factors, which are critical for the maintenance and self-renewal of embryonic stem cells. On the other hand, Oct-1 and Oct-2 are widely expressed in adult tissues. Oct-7, 8 and 9, also known as "brain factors", are predominantly expressed in the central nervous system during embryonic development. Oct-6 expression is confined to embryonic stem cells and the developing nervous system and skin, while Oct-11 is also involved in skin differentiation.

== Human Oct proteins ==
- Oct-1 - POU2F1
- Oct-2 - POU2F2
- Oct-3/4 – POU5F1
- Oct-6 – POU3F1
- Oct-7 – POU3F2
- Oct-8 – POU3F3
- Oct-9 – POU3F4
- Oct-11 – POU2F3
