= SSBP3 =

Protein-coding gene in humans

Identifiers
- Aliases: SSBP3, CSDP, SSDP, SSDP1, single stranded DNA binding protein 3
- External IDs: OMIM: 607390; MGI: 1919725; GeneCards: SSBP3

Gene location (Human)
Chr.	Chromosome 1 (human)
Band	1p32.3	Start	54,225,433 bp
Band	1p32.3	End	54,413,479 bp

Gene location (Mouse)
Chr.	Chromosome 4 (mouse)
Band	4|4 C7	Start	106,767,898 bp
Band	4|4 C7	End	106,906,891 bp
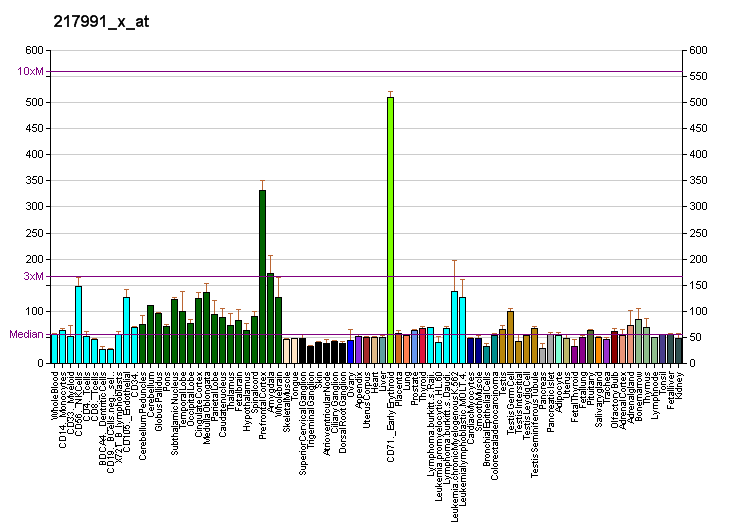
RNA expression pattern
Bgee	Human / Mouse (ortholog); Top expressed in: left ovary; popliteal artery; tibial arteries; right ovary; prefrontal cortex; anterior cingulate cortex; right frontal lobe; canal of the cervix; ectocervix; right coronary artery / Top expressed in: Rostral migratory stream; genital tubercle; tail of embryo; primary visual cortex; ventricular zone; superior frontal gyrus; epiblast; cerebellar cortex; ganglionic eminence; ascending aorta; More reference expression data
BioGPS	More reference expression data
Gene ontology
Molecular function	single-stranded DNA binding; DNA binding; protein binding; RNA polymerase II cis-regulatory region sequence-specific DNA binding; DNA-binding transcription activator activity, RNA polymerase II-specific
Cellular component	nucleus; protein-containing complex
Biological process	midbrain-hindbrain boundary initiation; positive regulation of transcription, DNA-templated; prechordal plate formation; head morphogenesis; positive regulation of anterior head development; regulation of transcription, DNA-templated; hematopoietic progenitor cell differentiation; transcription, DNA-templated; positive regulation of cell population proliferation; transcription by RNA polymerase II; positive regulation of transcription by RNA polymerase II; head development; protein-containing complex assembly
Sources:Amigo / QuickGO
Orthologs
Databases	NCBI: entry; OMA: entry
Species	Human	Mouse
Entrez	23648	72475
Ensembl	ENSG00000157216	ENSMUSG00000061887
UniProt	Q9BWW4	Q9D032
RefSeq (mRNA)	NM_001009955; NM_018070; NM_145716	NM_023672; NM_198438; NM_001355532
RefSeq (protein)	NP_001009955; NP_060540; NP_663768	NP_076161; NP_940840; NP_001342461
Location (UCSC)	Chr 1: 54.23 – 54.41 Mb	Chr 4: 106.77 – 106.91 Mb
PubMed search
- Wikidata
View/Edit Human	View/Edit Mouse

Single-stranded DNA-binding protein 3 is a protein that in humans is encoded by the SSBP3 gene.
