= Pituitary-specific positive transcription factor 1 =

Protein that controls rate of transcription of GH genes

POU1F1
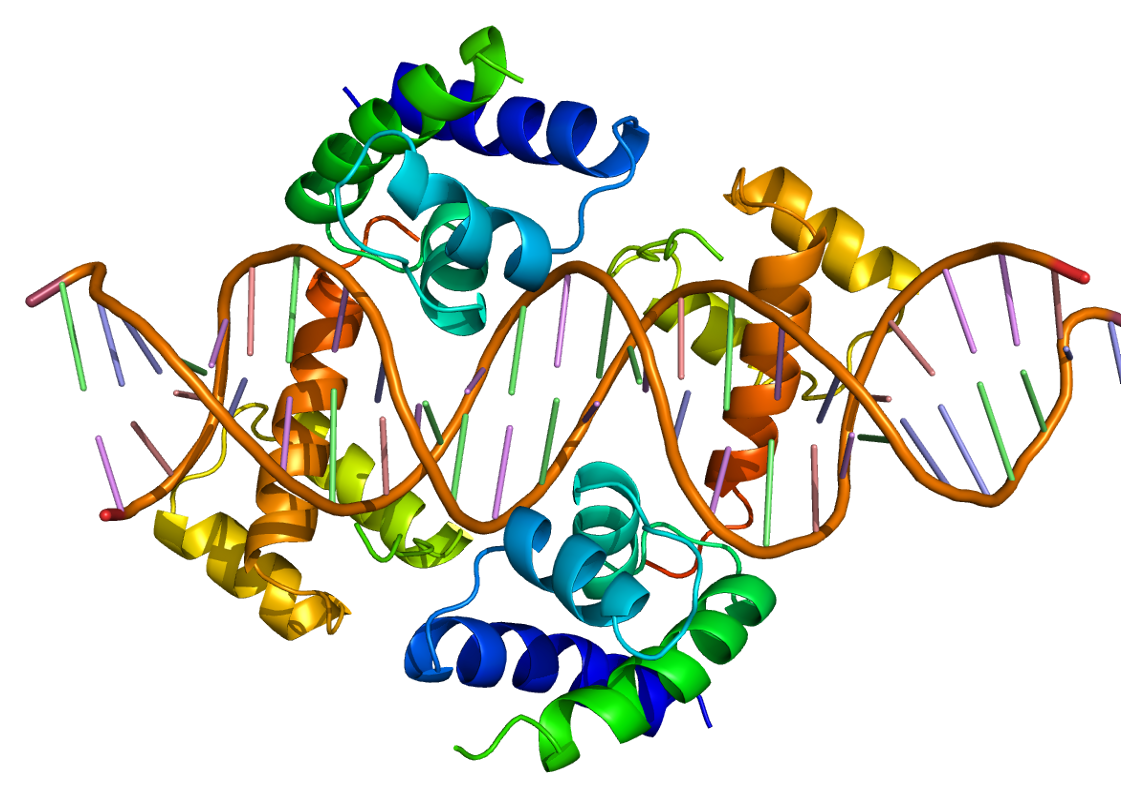

Identifiers
- Aliases: POU1F1, CPHD1, GHF-1, PIT1, POU1F1a, Pit-1, POU class 1 homeobox 1
- External IDs: OMIM: 173110; MGI: 97588; GeneCards: POU1F1

Gene location (Human)
Chr.	Chromosome 3 (human)
Band	3p11.2	Start	87,259,404 bp
Band	3p11.2	End	87,276,584 bp

Gene location (Mouse)
Chr.	Chromosome 16 (mouse)
Band	16 C1.3|16 37.25 cM	Start	65,317,397 bp
Band	16 C1.3|16 37.25 cM	End	65,331,891 bp
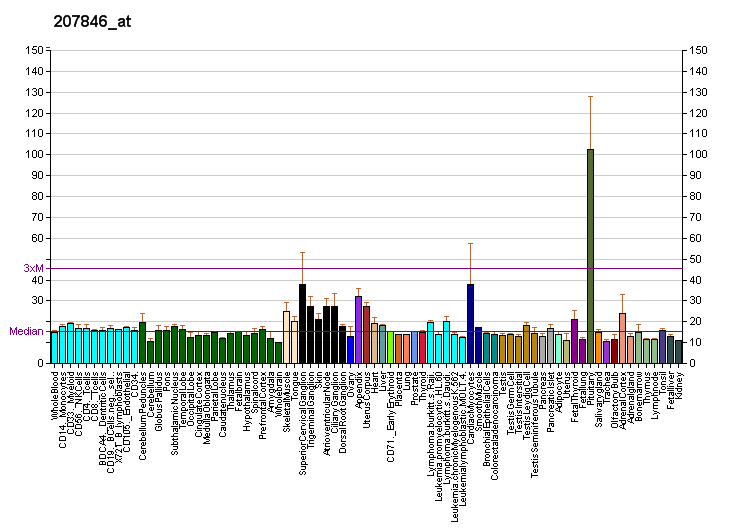
RNA expression pattern
Bgee	Human / Mouse (ortholog); Top expressed in: pituitary gland; anterior pituitary; muscle of thigh; striated muscle tissue; skeletal muscle tissue; gastrocnemius muscle; Brodmann area 9; right uterine tube; mucosa of transverse colon; right coronary artery / Top expressed in: female urethra; anterior pituitary; embryo; pars distalis of adenohypophysis; bone marrow; duodenum; urinary bladder; ovary; More reference expression data
BioGPS	More reference expression data
Gene ontology
Molecular function	sequence-specific DNA binding; DNA binding; transcription corepressor activity; transcription coactivator activity; DNA-binding transcription activator activity, RNA polymerase II-specific; RNA polymerase II cis-regulatory region sequence-specific DNA binding; chromatin binding; DNA-binding transcription factor activity; transcription factor binding; DNA-binding transcription factor activity, RNA polymerase II-specific
Cellular component	nucleus; transcription regulator complex; chromatin
Biological process	negative regulation of cell population proliferation; somatotropin secreting cell development; adenohypophysis development; positive regulation of inositol trisphosphate biosynthetic process; regulation of insulin-like growth factor receptor signaling pathway; pituitary gland development; regulation of transcription, DNA-templated; cell fate specification; B cell differentiation; positive regulation of cell population proliferation; positive regulation of transcription, DNA-templated; determination of adult lifespan; positive regulation of transcription by RNA polymerase II; positive regulation of multicellular organism growth; nuclear transport; negative regulation of transcription by RNA polymerase II; somatotropin secreting cell differentiation; transcription, DNA-templated; transcription by RNA polymerase II
Sources:Amigo / QuickGO
Orthologs
Databases	NCBI: entry; OMA: entry
Species	Human	Mouse
Entrez	5449	18736
Ensembl	ENSG00000064835	ENSMUSG00000004842
UniProt	P28069	Q00286
RefSeq (mRNA)	NM_001122757; NM_000306	NM_008849; NM_001362468
RefSeq (protein)	NP_000297; NP_001116229	NP_032875; NP_001349397
Location (UCSC)	Chr 3: 87.26 – 87.28 Mb	Chr 16: 65.32 – 65.33 Mb
PubMed search
- Wikidata
View/Edit Human	View/Edit Mouse

POU class 1 homeobox 1, also known as pituitary-specific positive transcription factor 1 (PIT1), POU domain, class 1, transcription factor 1 (POU1F1) and growth hormone factor 1 (GHF1), is a transcription factor for growth hormone encoded by the gene POU1F1.

== Function ==
PIT1 is part of the POU family of transcription factors. It is expressed by somatotrophic cells, as well as thyrotrophs and lactotrophs of the anterior pituitary gland. It contains a C-terminal domain for transactivation. Another domain is DNA binding—its C-terminal portion is homologous to the homeodomain consensus, common to many genes involved in development, while the other portion is POU specific, affords PIT1 specificity in its transcriptional activation of the prolactin and growth hormone genes and is involved in protein-protein interactions. Activity on thyroid stimulating hormone-beta expression is also known for PIT1.

== Interactions ==
Pituitary-specific positive transcription factor 1 has been shown to interact with GATA2 and PITX1.
