= NPAT (gene) =

Protein-coding gene in the species Homo sapiens

Identifiers
- Aliases: NPAT, E14, E14/p220, nuclear protein, co-activator of histone transcription, nuclear protein, coactivator of histone transcription
- External IDs: OMIM: 601448; MGI: 107605; HomoloGene: 1888; GeneCards: NPAT; OMA:NPAT - orthologs

Gene location (Human)
Chr.	Chromosome 11 (human)
Band	11q22.3	Start	108,157,215 bp
Band	11q22.3	End	108,222,638 bp

Gene location (Mouse)
Chr.	Chromosome 9 (mouse)
Band	9 A5.3|9 29.12 cM	Start	53,448,347 bp
Band	9 A5.3|9 29.12 cM	End	53,485,642 bp
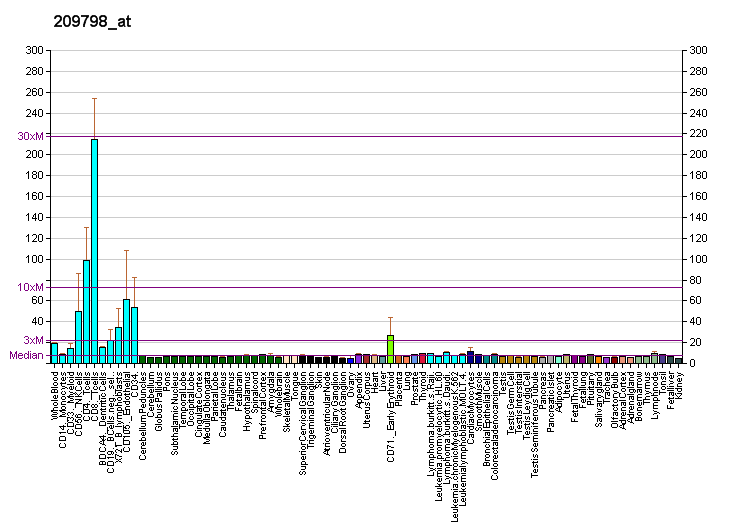

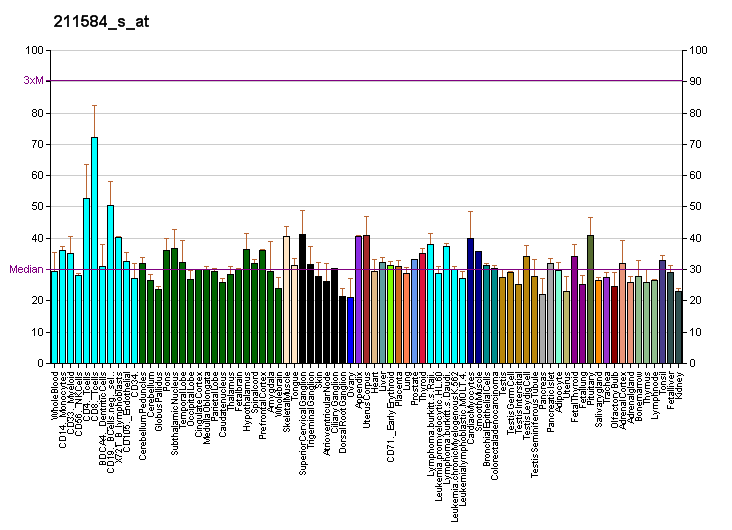
RNA expression pattern
Bgee	Human / Mouse (ortholog); Top expressed in: secondary oocyte; Achilles tendon; testicle; endothelial cell; visceral pleura; gonad; parietal pleura; epithelium of colon; tibia; tonsil / Top expressed in: hand; Gonadal ridge; primitive streak; external carotid artery; superior cervical ganglion; otolith organ; utricle; substantia nigra; genital tubercle; trigeminal ganglion; More reference expression data
BioGPS	More reference expression data
Gene ontology
Molecular function	transcription coactivator activity; protein C-terminus binding; protein binding; transcription corepressor activity; protein N-terminus binding; transcription coregulator activity
Cellular component	cytoplasm; Cajal body; nucleus; gemini of coiled bodies; nucleoplasm
Biological process	regulation of gene expression; positive regulation of transcription, DNA-templated; cell cycle; regulation of transcription, DNA-templated; regulation of transcription involved in G1/S transition of mitotic cell cycle; transcription, DNA-templated; negative regulation of nucleic acid-templated transcription
Sources:Amigo / QuickGO
Orthologs
Species	Human	Mouse
Entrez	4863	244879
Ensembl	ENSG00000149308	ENSMUSG00000033054
UniProt	Q14207	Q8BMA5
RefSeq (mRNA)	NM_002519; NM_001321307	NM_001081152; NM_178905
RefSeq (protein)	NP_001308236; NP_002510	NP_001074621
Location (UCSC)	Chr 11: 108.16 – 108.22 Mb	Chr 9: 53.45 – 53.49 Mb
PubMed search
- Wikidata
View/Edit Human	View/Edit Mouse

Protein NPAT also known as nuclear protein of the ATM locus is a protein that in humans is encoded by the NPAT gene.

== Interactions ==
NPAT (gene) has been shown to interact with Glyceraldehyde 3-phosphate dehydrogenase and POU2F1.

== See also ==
- ATM serine/threonine kinase, also located at 11p22.3, so the location is "ATM locus"
