= SRG1 RNA =

SRG1
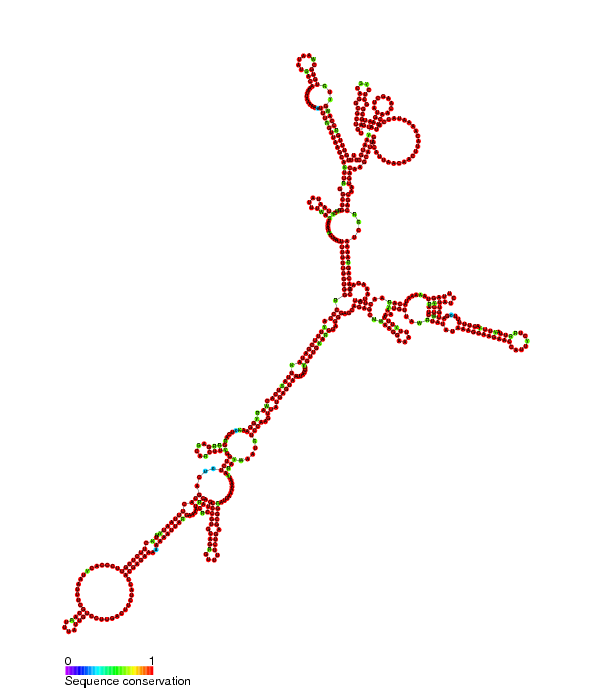
- Conserved secondary structure of SRG1 RNA

Identifiers
- Symbol: SRG1
- Rfam: RF01765

Other data
- RNA type: Gene; Cis-reg;
- Domain: Saccharomyces
- PDB structures: PDBe

SRG1 RNA (SER3 regulatory gene 1) is a non-coding RNA which represses the expression of SER3 (YER081W). SER3 is a gene which codes for a phosphoglycerate dehydrogenase involved in the biosynthesis of serine. SRG1 represses SER3 expression via transcription interference, and in that respect is the first intergenic transcript of its kind.

SRG1 was identified when chromatin immunoprecipitation (ChIP) assays showed that in Saccharomyces cerevisiae, even when SER3 was being repressed, TATA-binding protein and RNA Polymerase II were still bound to the SER3 DNA in such a way that should have caused active transcription. Further analysis found a second TATA box 558 bp upstream of SER3. A bioinformatic scan identified this same TATA box element in related Saccharomyces. SRG1 has been found to be cis-acting, it had no repressive effect when in trans.

SRG1 RNA is unrelated to Senescence Related Gene 1 (SRG1), a protein-coding gene found in Arabidopsis thaliana, and is also distinct from Stress Response Gene 1 (SRG1) found in Medicago sativa.
