= Pure hair-nail type ectodermal dysplasia =

- Other names: Hair-nail ectodermal dysplasia

Pure hair-nail type ectodermal dysplasia is a genetic mutation in the "hair matrix and cuticle keratin KRTHB5 gene" that causes ectodermal dysplasia of hair and nail type. Manifestations of this disorder include onychodystrophy and severe hypotrichosis. It represents as an autosomal dominant trait.

== See also ==
- List of cutaneous conditions
