= POU3F1 =

Protein-coding gene in humans

Identifiers
- Aliases: POU3F1, OCT6, OTF6, SCIP, POU class 3 homeobox 1
- External IDs: OMIM: 602479; MGI: 101896; GeneCards: POU3F1

Gene location (Human)
Chr.	Chromosome 1 (human)
Band	1p34.3	Start	38,043,829 bp
Band	1p34.3	End	38,046,793 bp

Gene location (Mouse)
Chr.	Chromosome 4 (mouse)
Band	4 D2.2|4 57.86 cM	Start	124,550,600 bp
Band	4 D2.2|4 57.86 cM	End	124,554,448 bp
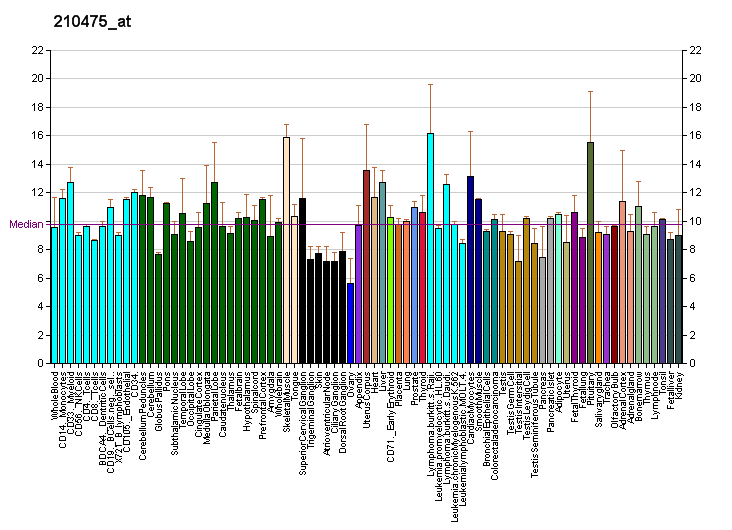

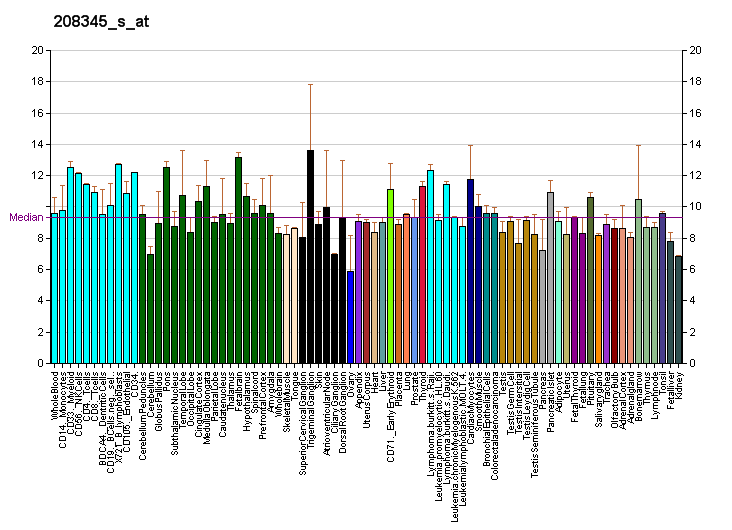
RNA expression pattern
Bgee	Human / Mouse (ortholog); Top expressed in: skin of abdomen; tibial nerve; skin of leg; gonad; skin of arm; Region I of hippocampus proper; gums; caudate nucleus; sural nerve; putamen / Top expressed in: Region I of hippocampus proper; barrel cortex; skin of external ear; dorsal striatum; ganglionic eminence; female urethra; medial ganglionic eminence; hair follicle; nucleus accumbens; hippocampus proper; More reference expression data
BioGPS	More reference expression data
Gene ontology
Molecular function	DNA-binding transcription factor activity; transcription coactivator activity; DNA binding; sequence-specific DNA binding; DNA-binding transcription factor activity, RNA polymerase II-specific
Cellular component	transcription regulator complex; nucleus; nucleoplasm
Biological process	axon ensheathment; regulation of transcription by RNA polymerase II; myelination; forebrain development; Schwann cell development; brain development; regulation of transcription, DNA-templated; transcription, DNA-templated; myelination in peripheral nervous system; keratinocyte differentiation; positive regulation of transcription by RNA polymerase II; epidermis development; positive regulation of transcription, DNA-templated; positive regulation of gene expression; transcription by RNA polymerase II
Sources:Amigo / QuickGO
Orthologs
Databases	NCBI: entry; OMA: entry
Species	Human	Mouse
Entrez	5453	18991
Ensembl	ENSG00000185668	ENSMUSG00000090125
UniProt	Q03052	P21952
RefSeq (mRNA)	NM_002699	NM_011141
RefSeq (protein)	NP_002690	NP_035271
Location (UCSC)	Chr 1: 38.04 – 38.05 Mb	Chr 4: 124.55 – 124.55 Mb
PubMed search
- Wikidata
View/Edit Human	View/Edit Mouse

POU domain, class 3, transcription factor 1 (also known as Oct-6) is a protein that in humans is encoded by the POU3F1 gene.

== See also ==
- Octamer transcription factor
