= Oct-2 =

Mammalian protein found in Homo sapiens

POU2F2

Identifiers
- Aliases: POU2F2, OCT2, OTF2, Oct-2, POU class 2 homeobox 2
- External IDs: OMIM: 164176; MGI: 101897; GeneCards: POU2F2
Available structures
PDB	Ortholog search: PDBe RCSB
PDB	List of PDB id codes 1HDP

Gene location (Human)
Chr.	Chromosome 19 (human)
Band	19q13.2	Start	42,086,110 bp
Band	19q13.2	End	42,196,585 bp

Gene location (Mouse)
Chr.	Chromosome 7 (mouse)
Band	7 A3|7 13.73 cM	Start	24,786,769 bp
Band	7 A3|7 13.73 cM	End	24,879,151 bp
RNA expression pattern
Bgee	Human / Mouse (ortholog); Top expressed in: monocyte; buccal mucosa cell; granulocyte; lymph node; pancreatic ductal cell; paraflocculus of cerebellum; blood; vena cava; frontal pole; middle frontal gyrus / Top expressed in: zygote; Olfactory peduncle; pelvic ganglion; secondary oocyte; male urethra; lumbar subsegment of spinal cord; molecular layer of cerebellar cortex; neural layer of retina; epithelium of male urethra; spleen; More reference expression data
BioGPS	n/a
Gene ontology
Molecular function	DNA-binding transcription factor activity; protein domain specific binding; DNA binding; DNA-binding transcription activator activity, RNA polymerase II-specific; sequence-specific DNA binding; RNA polymerase II cis-regulatory region sequence-specific DNA binding; DNA-binding transcription factor activity, RNA polymerase II-specific
Cellular component	nucleus; cytoplasm; nucleoplasm; intracellular membrane-bounded organelle
Biological process	humoral immune response; regulation of transcription, DNA-templated; cell maturation; positive regulation of transcription by RNA polymerase II; positive regulation of transcription, DNA-templated; transcription, DNA-templated; mature B cell differentiation; transcription by RNA polymerase II; snRNA transcription by RNA polymerase II
Sources:Amigo / QuickGO
Orthologs
Databases	NCBI: entry; OMA: entry
Species	Human	Mouse
Entrez	5452	18987
Ensembl	ENSG00000028277	ENSMUSG00000008496
UniProt	P09086	Q00196
RefSeq (mRNA)	NM_001207025; NM_001207026; NM_001247994; NM_002698; NM_001393934 NM_001393935; NM_001393936; NM_001394376; NM_001394377; NM_001394378	NM_001163554; NM_001163555; NM_001163556; NM_011138
RefSeq (protein)	NP_001193954; NP_001193955; NP_001234923; NP_002689	NP_001157026; NP_001157027; NP_001157028; NP_035268
Location (UCSC)	Chr 19: 42.09 – 42.2 Mb	Chr 7: 24.79 – 24.88 Mb
PubMed search
- Wikidata
View/Edit Human	View/Edit Mouse

POU domain, class 2, transcription factor 2

Identifiers
- Symbol: POU2F2
- Alt. symbols: OTF2
- NCBI gene: 5452
- HGNC: 9213
- OMIM: 164176
- RefSeq: NM_002698
- UniProt: P09086

Other data
- Locus: Chr. 19
Search for
- Structures: Swiss-model
- Domains: InterPro

Oct-2 (octamer-binding protein 2) also known as POU domain, class 2, transcription factor 2 is a protein that in humans is encoded by the POU2F2 gene.

Oct-2 is an octamer transcription factor which is a member of the POU family.
