= POU3F2 =

Protein-coding gene in the species Homo sapiens

Identifiers
- Aliases: POU3F2, BRN2, N-Oct3, OCT7, OTF-7, OTF7, POUF3, brn-2, oct-7, POU class 3 homeobox 2
- External IDs: OMIM: 600494; MGI: 101895; GeneCards: POU3F2

Gene location (Human)
| Chr. | Chromosome 6 (human) |
| Band | 6q16.1 | Start | 98,834,574 bp |
| Band | 6q16.1 | End | 98,839,458 bp |
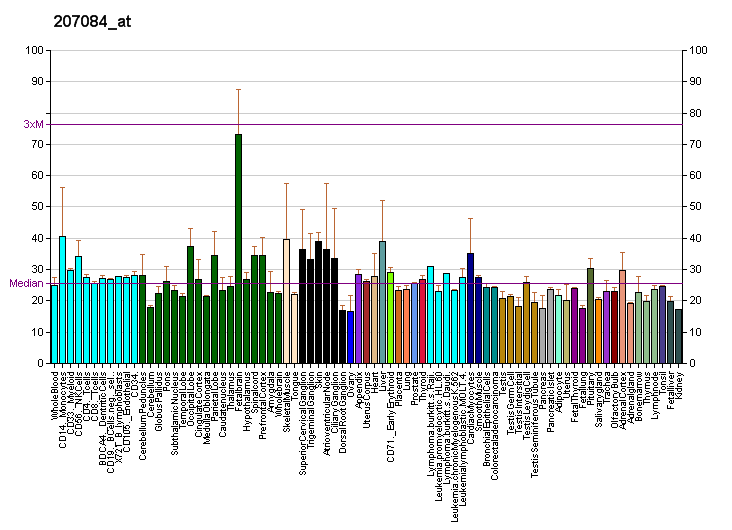
RNA expression pattern
| Bgee | Human / Mouse (ortholog); Top expressed in: ganglionic eminence; ventricular zone; buccal mucosa cell; pars reticulata; internal globus pallidus; ventral tegmental area; pars compacta; inferior ganglion of vagus nerve; primary visual cortex; superior vestibular nucleus / n/a; More reference expression data |
| BioGPS | More reference expression data |
Gene ontology
| Molecular function | DNA binding; transcription coactivator activity; sequence-specific DNA binding; DNA-binding transcription activator activity, RNA polymerase II-specific; RNA polymerase II cis-regulatory region sequence-specific DNA binding; protein binding; identical protein binding; DNA-binding transcription factor activity; DNA-binding transcription factor activity, RNA polymerase II-specific |
| Cellular component | transcription regulator complex; nucleus |
| Biological process | cellular response to organic substance; regulation of transcription, DNA-templated; astrocyte development; hypothalamus cell differentiation; Schwann cell development; transcription by RNA polymerase II; negative regulation of gene expression; myelination in peripheral nervous system; transcription, DNA-templated; regulation of axonogenesis; forebrain ventricular zone progenitor cell division; neurohypophysis development; brain development; positive regulation of cell population proliferation; epidermis development; positive regulation of multicellular organism growth; regulation of cell differentiation; cerebral cortex radially oriented cell migration; positive regulation of transcription by RNA polymerase II; regulation of transcription by RNA polymerase II; nervous system development; neuron differentiation; neuron fate commitment; neuron fate specification; neuron development; cell differentiation |
Sources:Amigo / QuickGO
Orthologs
| Databases | NCBI: entry; OMA: entry |
| Species | Human | Mouse |
| Entrez | 5454 | 18992 |
| Ensembl | ENSG00000184486 | ENSMUSG00000095139 |
| UniProt | P20265 | P31360 |
| RefSeq (mRNA) | NM_005604 | NM_008899 |
| RefSeq (protein) | NP_005595 | NP_032925 |
| Location (UCSC) | Chr 6: 98.83 – 98.84 Mb | n/a |
| PubMed search |
- Wikidata
| View/Edit Human | View/Edit Mouse |

POU domain, class 3, transcription factor 2 is a protein that in humans is encoded by the POU3F2 gene.

== Function ==
N-Oct-3 is a protein belonging to a large family of transcription factors that bind to the octameric DNA sequence ATGCAAAT. Most of these proteins share a highly homologous region, referred to as the POU domain, which occurs in several mammalian transcription factors, including the octamer-binding proteins Oct1 (POU2F1; MIM 164175) and Oct2 (POU2F2; MIM 164176), and the pituitary protein Pit1 (PIT1; MIM 173110).

Class III POU genes are expressed predominantly in the CNS. It is likely that CNS-specific transcription factors such as these play an important role in mammalian neurogenesis by regulating their diverse patterns of gene expression.

== Disease linkage ==
The POU3F2 protein associates with the Bipolar disorder. It is involved in the neocortex development in mice, and is linked to a single nucleotide polymorphism, Rs1906252, that is associated with a cognitive phenotype: processing information speed.

Chromosome 6q16.1 deletions resulting in loss of one copy of POU3F2 have been shown to cause a human syndrome of susceptibility to obesity and variable levels of developmental delay and Intellectual Disability.

== Interactions ==
POU3F2 has been shown to interact with PQBP1.

== See also ==
- Octamer transcription factor
