= POU2F1 =

Protein-coding gene in humans

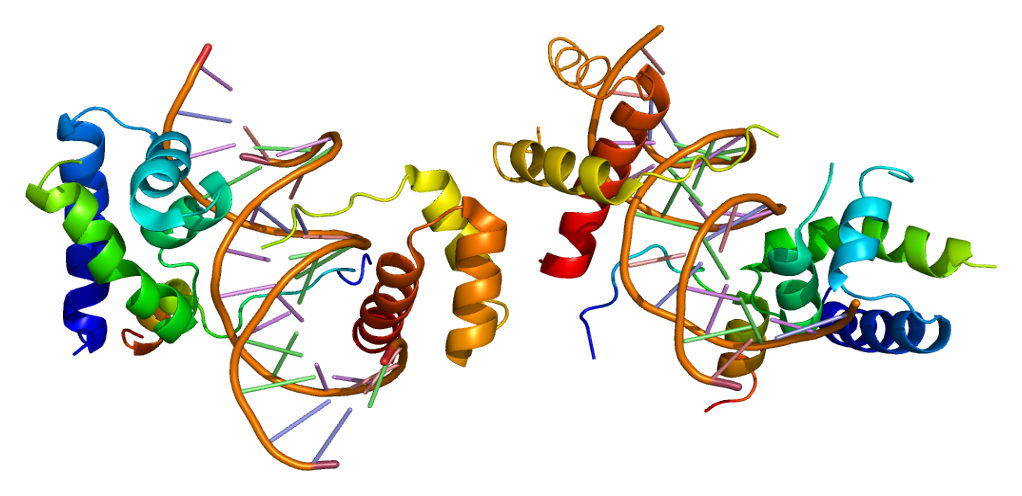

Identifiers
- Aliases: POU2F1, OCT1, OTF1, oct-1B, POU class 2 homeobox 1, Oct1Z
- External IDs: OMIM: 164175; MGI: 101898; GeneCards: POU2F1
Available structures
| PDB | Ortholog search: PDBe RCSB |
| PDB | List of PDB id codes 1CQT, 1E3O, 1GT0, 1HF0, 1O4X, 1OCT, 1POG |

Gene location (Human)
| Chr. | Chromosome 1 (human) |
| Band | 1q24.2 | Start | 167,220,876 bp |
| Band | 1q24.2 | End | 167,427,345 bp |

Gene location (Mouse)
| Chr. | Chromosome 1 (mouse) |
| Band | 1 H2.3|1 73.21 cM | Start | 165,692,723 bp |
| Band | 1 H2.3|1 73.21 cM | End | 165,830,247 bp |
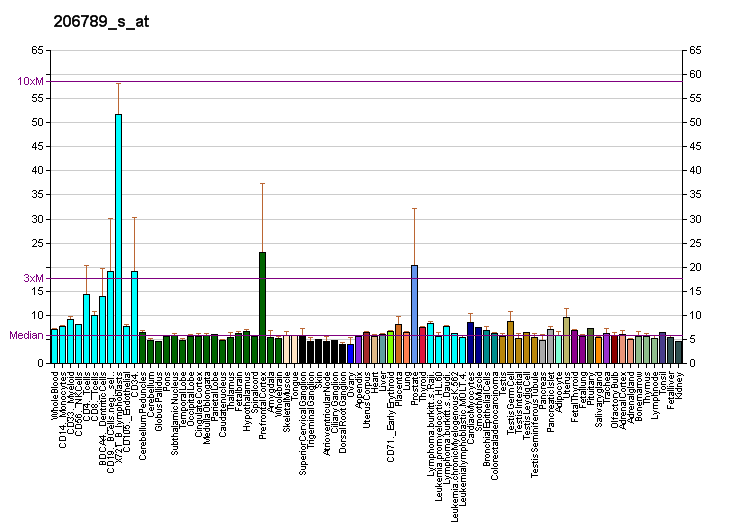
RNA expression pattern
| Bgee | Human / Mouse (ortholog); Top expressed in: buccal mucosa cell; secondary oocyte; sural nerve; gonad; testicle; Achilles tendon; cerebellar vermis; Skeletal muscle tissue of rectus abdominis; tendon of biceps brachii; epithelium of colon / Top expressed in: Rostral migratory stream; zygote; tail of embryo; genital tubercle; secondary oocyte; primitive streak; primary oocyte; renal corpuscle; ciliary body; embryo; More reference expression data |
| BioGPS | More reference expression data |
Gene ontology
| Molecular function | sequence-specific DNA binding; protein binding; RNA polymerase II core promoter sequence-specific DNA binding; RNA polymerase II general transcription initiation factor activity; DNA binding; DNA-binding transcription factor activity; DNA-binding transcription factor activity, RNA polymerase II-specific; RNA polymerase II cis-regulatory region sequence-specific DNA binding |
| Cellular component | endoplasmic reticulum; nucleus; intracellular membrane-bounded organelle; nucleoplasm; RNA polymerase II transcription regulator complex |
| Biological process | negative regulation of transcription, DNA-templated; regulation of transcription, DNA-templated; transcription, DNA-templated; snRNA transcription by RNA polymerase II; positive regulation of transcription by RNA polymerase II; cytokine-mediated signaling pathway |
Sources:Amigo / QuickGO
Orthologs
| Databases | NCBI: entry; OMA: entry |
| Species | Human | Mouse |
| Entrez | 5451 | 18986 |
| Ensembl | ENSG00000143190 | ENSMUSG00000026565 |
| UniProt | P14859 | P25425 |
| RefSeq (mRNA) | NM_001198783; NM_001198786; NM_002697; NM_001365848; NM_001365849 | NM_011137; NM_198932; NM_198933; NM_198934; NM_001368808 |
| RefSeq (protein) | NP_001185712; NP_001185715; NP_002688; NP_001352777; NP_001352778 | NP_035267; NP_945150; NP_945151; NP_945152; NP_001355737 |
| Location (UCSC) | Chr 1: 167.22 – 167.43 Mb | Chr 1: 165.69 – 165.83 Mb |
| PubMed search |
- Wikidata
| View/Edit Human | View/Edit Mouse |

POU domain, class 2, transcription factor 1 is a protein that in humans is encoded by the POU2F1 gene.

== Interactions ==
POU2F1 has been shown to interact with:

- EPRS,
- Glucocorticoid receptor,
- Glyceraldehyde 3-phosphate dehydrogenase,
- Host cell factor C1,
- Ku80,
- MNAT1
- NPAT,
- Nuclear receptor co-repressor 2,
- POU2AF1,
- RELA,
- Retinoid X receptor alpha,
- SNAPC4,
- Sp1 transcription factor, and
- TATA binding protein.

== See also ==
- Octamer transcription factor
