= Pulmonary neuroendocrine tumor =

Pulmonary neuroendocrine tumors are neuroendocrine tumors localized to the lung: bronchus or pulmonary parenchyma.

Pulmonary neuroendocrine tumors include a spectrum of tumors from the low-grade typical pulmonary carcinoid tumor and intermediate-grade atypical pulmonary carcinoid tumor to the high-grade pulmonary large cell neuroendocrine carcinoma (LCNEC) and pulmonary small cell carcinoma (SCLC), with significant clinical, epidemiologic and genetic differences.

== Types ==
Pulmonary neuroendocrine tumor are classified according to tumoral grade:

- Low grade pulmonary neuroendocrine tumor: Typical pulmonary carcinoid tumour (TC; low-grade);
- Intermediate-grade pulmonary neuroendocrine tumor: Atypical pulmonary carcinoid tumour (AC; intermediate-grade)
- High-grade pulmonary neuroendocrine tumor
  - Small cell lung cancer (SCLC)
  - Large cell neuroendocrine carcinoma (LCNEC of the lung)

Low-grade nodular neuroendocrine proliferations ≥ 0.5 cm are classified as carcinoid tumors and smaller ones are called pulmonary tumorlets.

When neuroendocrine cell hyperplasia and tumorlets are extensive, they represent the rare preinvasive lesion for carcinoids known as "diffuse idiopathic pulmonary neuroendocrine cell hyperplasia".

Both LCNEC and SCLC can demonstrate histologic heterogeneity with other major histologic types of lung carcinoma, such as pulmonary adenocarcinoma or pulmonary squamous cell carcinoma, but is not characteristic of TC or AC.

== Risk factor ==
Multiple endocrine neoplasia type I (MEN1)can be found in carcinoid tumor patients, but not those with LCNEC and SCLC.

== Genetics ==
Genetic changes are very high in SCLC and LCNEC, but usually low for TC, intermediate for AC.

== Diagnosis ==
The diagnosis of SCLC, TC and AC can be made by light microscopy without the need for special tests in most cases, but for LCNEC it is required to demonstrate NE differentiation by immunohistochemistry or electron microscopy.
