= Goblet cell carcinoid =

- Other names: Crypt cell carcinoma, neuroendocrine tumour with goblet cell differentiation
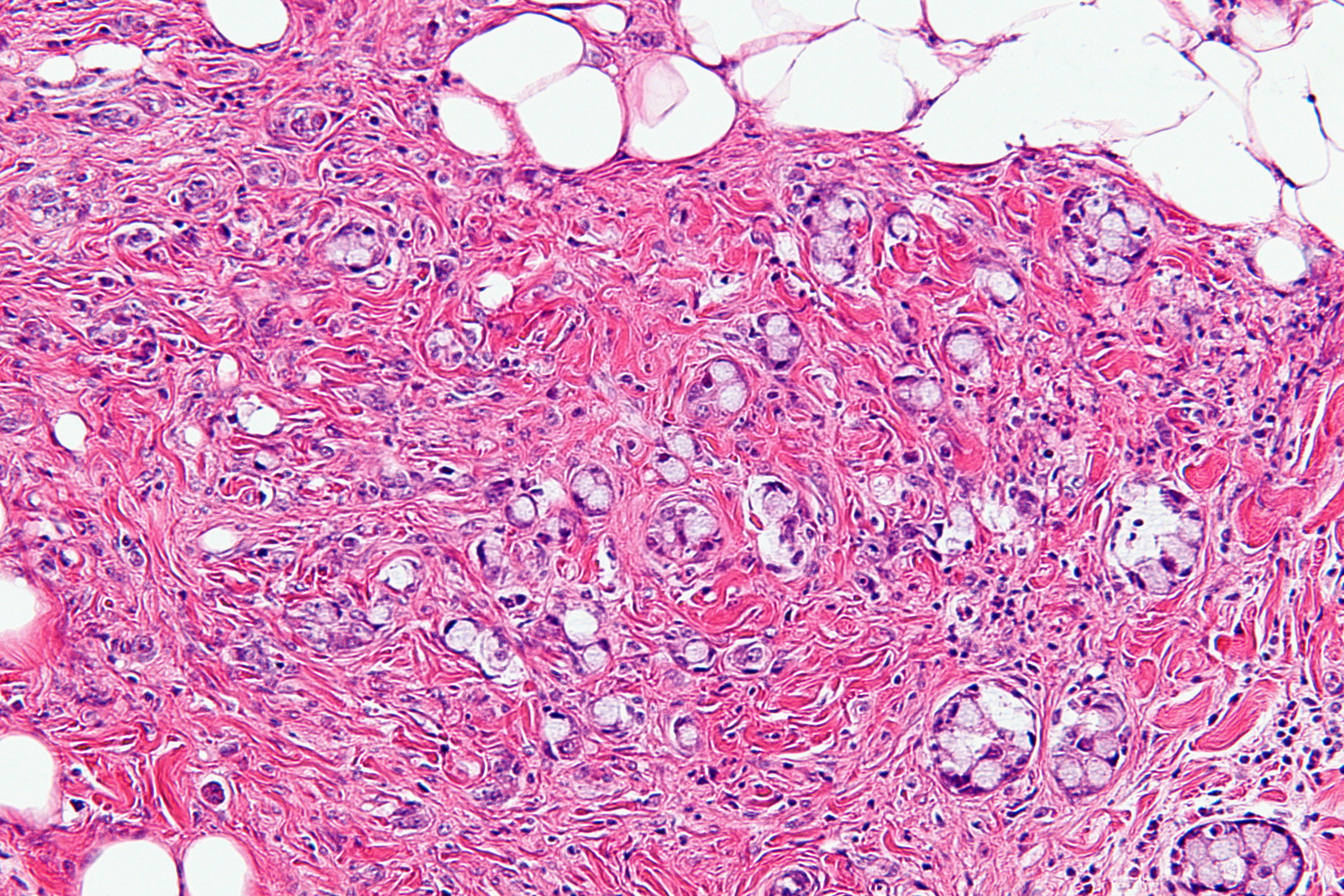
- Micrograph showing a goblet cell carcinoid. H&E stain.

The goblet cell carcinoid (GCC) is a rare biphasic gastrointestinal tract tumour that consists of a neuroendocrine component and a conventional carcinoma, histologically arising from Paneth cells.

== Sign and symptoms ==
GCCs may present as appendicitis.

== Diagnosis ==
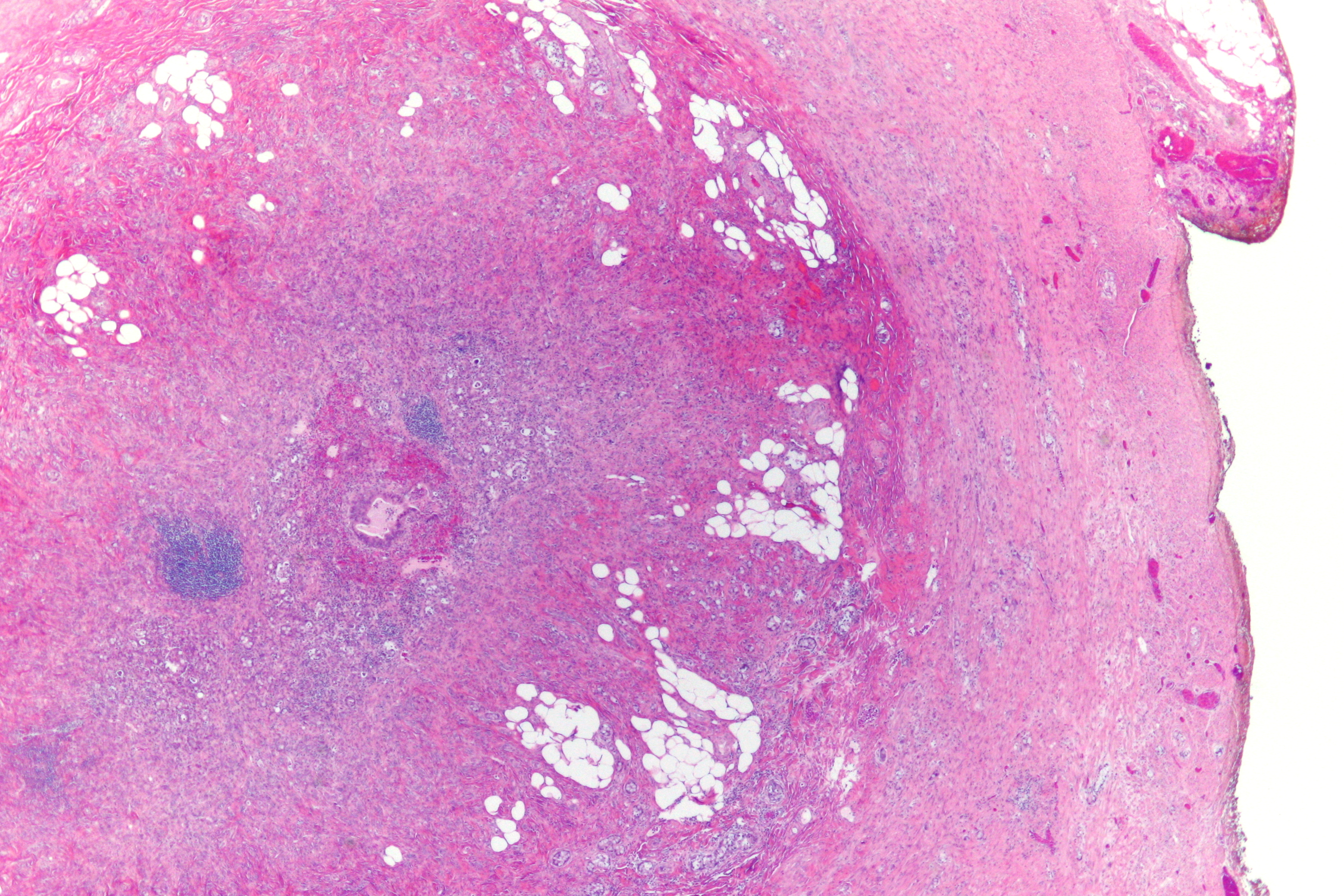
Micrograph of a goblet cell carcinoid. H&E stain.

GCCs are diagnosed by pathology. They have a characteristic biphasic appearance which includes (1) goblet cell-like cells, and (2) neuroendocrine-type nuclear chromatin (stippled chromatin).

== Prognosis ==
GCCs have an aggressive course compared to other appendiceal neuroendocrine tumours.

== Treatment ==
GCCs are treated with surgery.

== See also ==
- Neuroendocrine tumours
