= Pulmonary carcinoid tumour =

- Specialty: Oncology/pulmonology

Pulmonary carcinoid tumour is a neuroendocrine tumour of the lung.

There are two types:

- Typical pulmonary carcinoid tumour
- Atypical pulmonary carcinoid tumour
