= Typical pulmonary carcinoid tumour =

- Other names: Typical lung carcinoid tumour, lung carcinoid, typical lung carcinoid
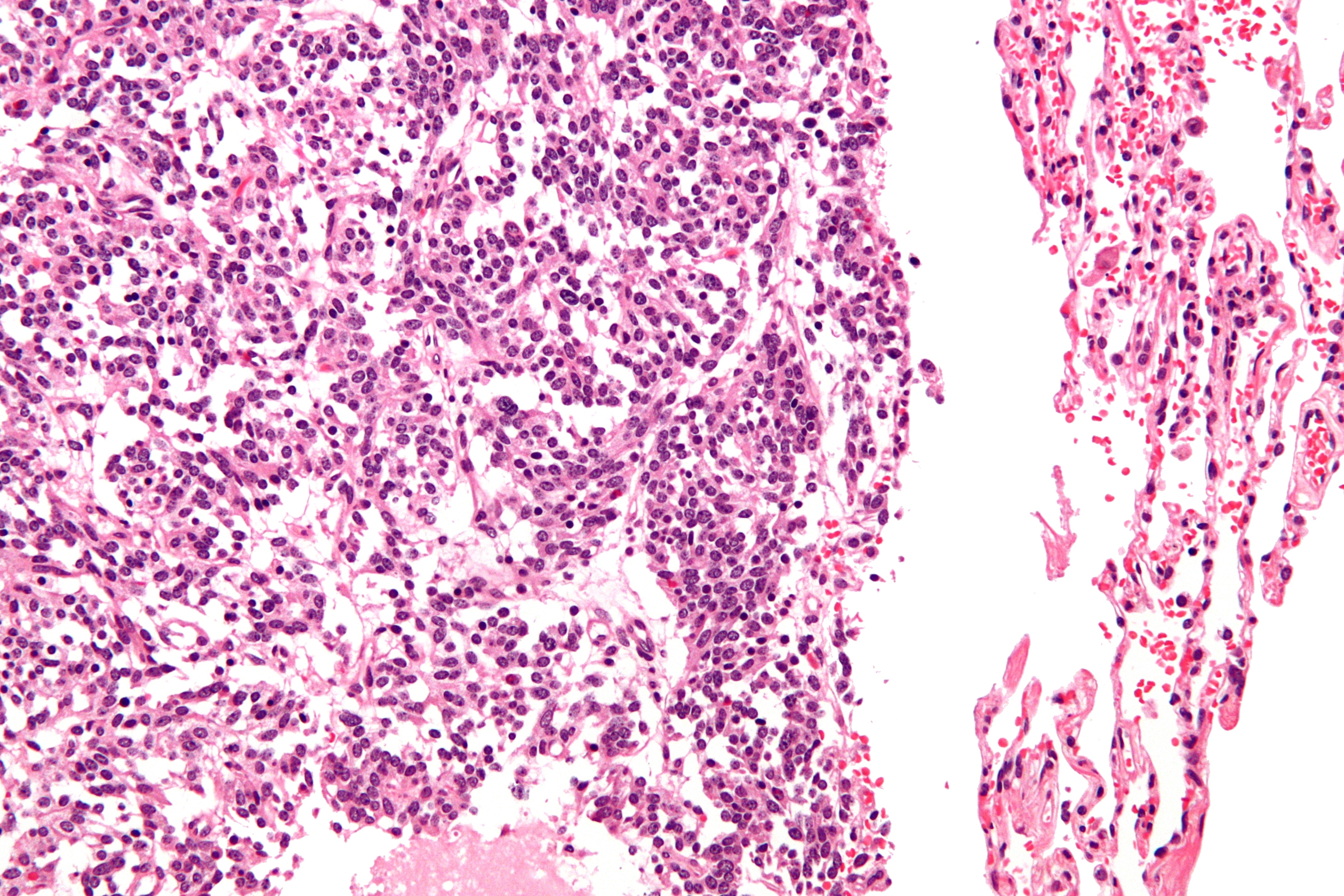
- Micrograph of a typical pulmonary carcinoid tumour.
- Specialty: Oncology

Typical pulmonary carcinoid tumour is a subtype of pulmonary carcinoid tumour. It is an uncommon low-grade malignant lung mass that is most often in the central airways of the lung.

== Signs and symptoms ==
Lung carcinoids typically present with a cough or hemoptysis. Findings may closely mimic malignant tumours of the lung, i.e. lung cancer.

== Diagnosis ==
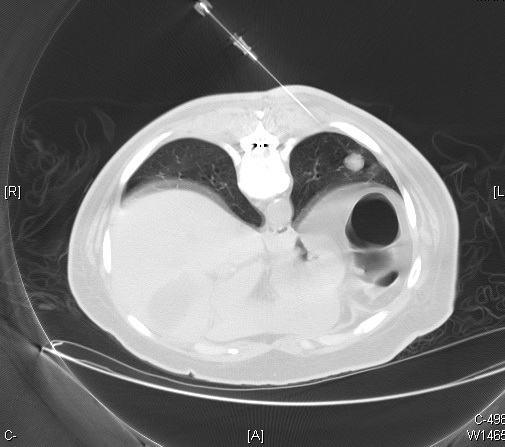
CT-guided biopsy of peripheral typical carcinoid tumor

The definitive diagnosis is rendered by a microscopic examination, after excision. Typical carcinoids have cells with stippled chromatin and a moderate quantity of cytoplasm. They typically have few mitoses and lack necrosis. By definition, they are greater than 4 mm in largest dimension; smaller lesions are referred to as pulmonary carcinoid tumourlets.

The differential diagnosis of typical pulmonary carcinoid tumour includes: atypical pulmonary carcinoid tumour, pulmonary carcinoid tumourlet and lung adenocarcinoma.

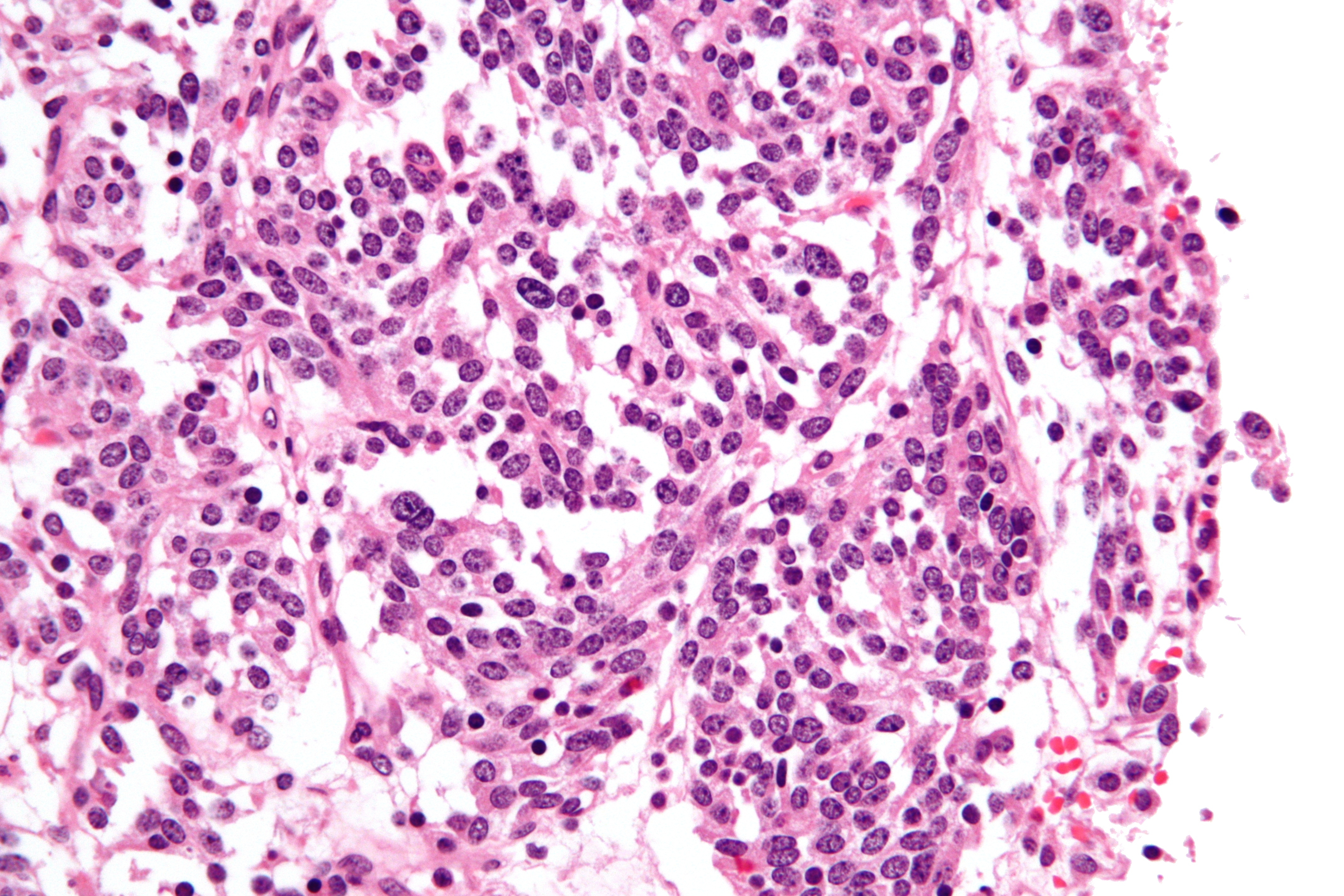
Very high magnification

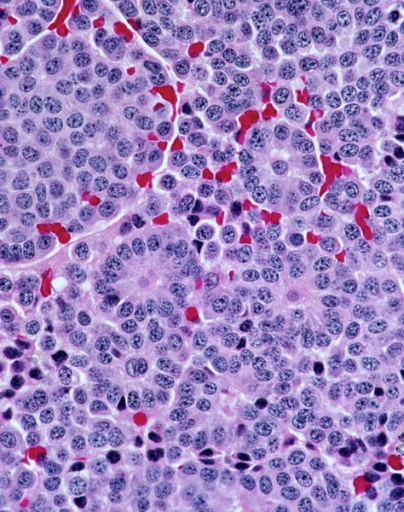
With prominent rosettes

== Treatment ==
Typical carcinoids are usually treated with surgical excision.

== See also ==
- Pulmonary tumor
- Lung cancer
- Atypical pulmonary carcinoid tumour
- Pulmonary neuroendocrine tumor
