= Endocrine oncology =

Medical speciality dealing with hormone producing tumors

Endocrine oncology refers to a medical speciality dealing with hormone-producing tumors, i.e. a combination of endocrinology and oncology.

Few centres are specializing in hormone producing tumors only, due to the relatively low incidence. Most centres have gastroenterologists, oncologist or endocrinologists who deal with other diseases as well. One exception is the Uppsala Centre of Excellence in Neuroendocrine Tumors at Uppsala University Hospital in Sweden, where doctors treat only endocrine tumors.

== Endocrine tumors ==
There are many different kinds of endocrine tumors, some of which are listed below:

- Gastrointestinal
  - ECLoma
  - Midgut carcinoid
  - Appendix carcinoid
  - Hindgut carcinoid sometimes also referred to as Rectal carcinoid
- Pulmonary
  - Typical bronchial carcinoid
  - Atypical bronchial carcinoid
  - Large cell neuroendocrine carcinoma
  - Small cell lung cancer
- Endocrine pancreatic tumors
  - Non-functioning endocrine pancreatic tumors
  - Insulinoma
  - Gastrinoma
  - Glucagonoma
  - VIPoma
- Adrenals
  - Adrenocortical carcinoma
  - Pheochromocytoma
- Endocrine tumor syndromes
  - Multiple Endocrine Neoplasia I, MEN1
  - Multiple Endocrine Neoplasia II, MEN2
  - von Hippel Lindau syndrome
