= Diffuse idiopathic pulmonary neuroendocrine cell hyperplasia =

- Other names: DIPNECH
- Specialty: Respirology

Diffuse idiopathic pulmonary neuroendocrine cell hyperplasia (DIPNECH) is a diffuse parenchymal lung disease which often presents with symptoms of cough and shortness of breath. The pathological definition published by the World Health Organization is “a generalized proliferation of scattered single cells, small nodules (neuroendocrine bodies), or linear proliferations of pulmonary neuroendocrine (PNE) cells that may be confined to the bronchial and bronchiolar epithelium.” The true prevalence of this disease is not known. To date, just under 200 cases have been reported in the literature. However, with an increase in recognition of this disease by radiologists and pulmonologists, the number of cases has been increasing. DIPNECH predominantly affects middle-aged women with slowly progressive lung obstruction. DIPNECH is usually discovered in one of two ways: 1) as an unexpected finding following a lung surgery; or 2) by evaluation of a patient in a pulmonary clinic with longstanding, unexplained symptoms.

== Signs and symptoms ==
About 20% of DIPNECH patients are symptom free at the time they first present. The most common symptoms include:

- Chronic cough
- Shortness of breath or dyspnea when exercising or exerting one's self
- Wheezing (less frequent)
- Hemoptysis (Infrequent)

Symptoms may be present for many years prior to diagnosis and are often ascribed to other lung conditions. Erroneous initial diagnoses of asthma or chronic obstructive pulmonary disease often are made in patients with DIPNECH.

== Diagnosis ==
The major criterion for diagnosis is typically a confirmed surgical biopsy. Minor diagnostic criteria have been proposed for DIPNECH.

- Clinical presentation: woman, between the age of 45 and 67 with cough and/or shortness of breath for 5–10 years
- Pulmonary function: increased residual volume, increased total lung capacity, fixed obstruction, low diffusing capacity of the lung for carbon monoxide that corrects with alveolar volume
- High-resolution CT scan: diffuse pulmonary nodules 4–10 mm, greater than 20 nodules, mosaic attenuation or air trapping in greater than 50% of the lung
- Transbronchial biopsy: proliferation of pulmonary neuroendocrine cells
- Serum markers: elevated serum chromogranin A levels

=== Pathology ===
In most DIPNECH cases, upon examination of the lung tissue, the overgrowth of pulmonary neuroendocrine cells is seen along the small airways, with extension through the basement membrane of the bronchiolar epithelium leading to formation of carcinoid tumorlets. When the tumorlets become greater than 5mm in size they are considered bronchial carcinoids. Upon microscopic examination, the PNE cells have round, oval, or spindle nuclei with salt-and-pepper chromatin and clear or eosinophilic cytoplasm.

Although no formal definition exists regarding the extent of PNE hyperplasia necessary for a DIPNECH diagnosis, this process is often seen throughout the small airways. Because the hyperplasia of PNE cells can be seen as a reaction to chronic lung disease, surrounding solitary bronchial carcinoids and adenocarcinoma of the lung, these causes must be excluded prior to a DIPENCH diagnosis.

Obstructive bronchiolitis has been reported as a characteristic histopathologic finding in patients with DIPNECH. The bronchiolitis is thought to be a response of the small airways to neuropeptides secreted by the PNE cells.

=== Imaging ===
The findings on chest imaging in DIPNECH patients are bilateral and diffuse. The most frequent findings on a computed tomography (CT) of the chest are multiple primary nodules and/or masses, on a background of mosaic attenuation and airway wall thickening.

The nodules have an indolent pattern of growth and are found throughout the lungs. The nodules are typically rounded and well-defined. Upon surgical resection, histologically the nodules are found to be typical carcinoids or carcinoid tumorlets depending on size.

=== Pulmonary function studies ===
Although some patients present with normal lung function, pulmonary function tests generally demonstrate fixed airway obstruction with a decreased FEV1 and reduced FEV1/FVC ratio without bronchodilator response. Air trapping is common and leads to increased residual volumes. As the disease progresses, a mixed pattern of obstruction and restriction may develop. In general the obstructive lung disease is slowly progressive with periods of stability.

== Treatment ==
To date there have been no clinical trials to determine effective treatment for this disease. Some patients have been treated with somatostatin analogs. Although the cough associated with DIPNECH tends to diminish on this treatment, improvement in pulmonary function has not been clearly demonstrated. There are also reports of symptomatic treatment with long- and short-acting beta agonists. Although steroids, both oral and inhaled, have been used in the setting of DIPNECH, there is no clear improvement with this treatment.

It is not uncommon for typical carcinoids to arise within DIPNECH. Due to presence of these tumors, DIPNECH is classified as a pre-malignant condition. Although there have been reports of atypical carcinoids with local lymph node involvement, there are no reports of more aggressive neuroendocrine tumors, such as large cell neuroendocrine or small cell lung cancer, associated with DIPNECH. When isolated bronchial carcinoids are diagnosed, oncology guidelines recommend surgical resection with lymph node sampling. However, as multiple carcinoids may develop in the setting of DIPNECH, a more conservative approach is often considered to preserve lung function.

== Prognosis ==
The morbidity associated with DIPNECH is due to the associated obstructive lung disease. The lung disease tends to be slowly progressive, but given enough time can lead to significant disability and require supplemental oxygen therapy. There have been reports of lung transplantation in the setting of end-stage DIPNECH.
