= Uppsala University Hospital =

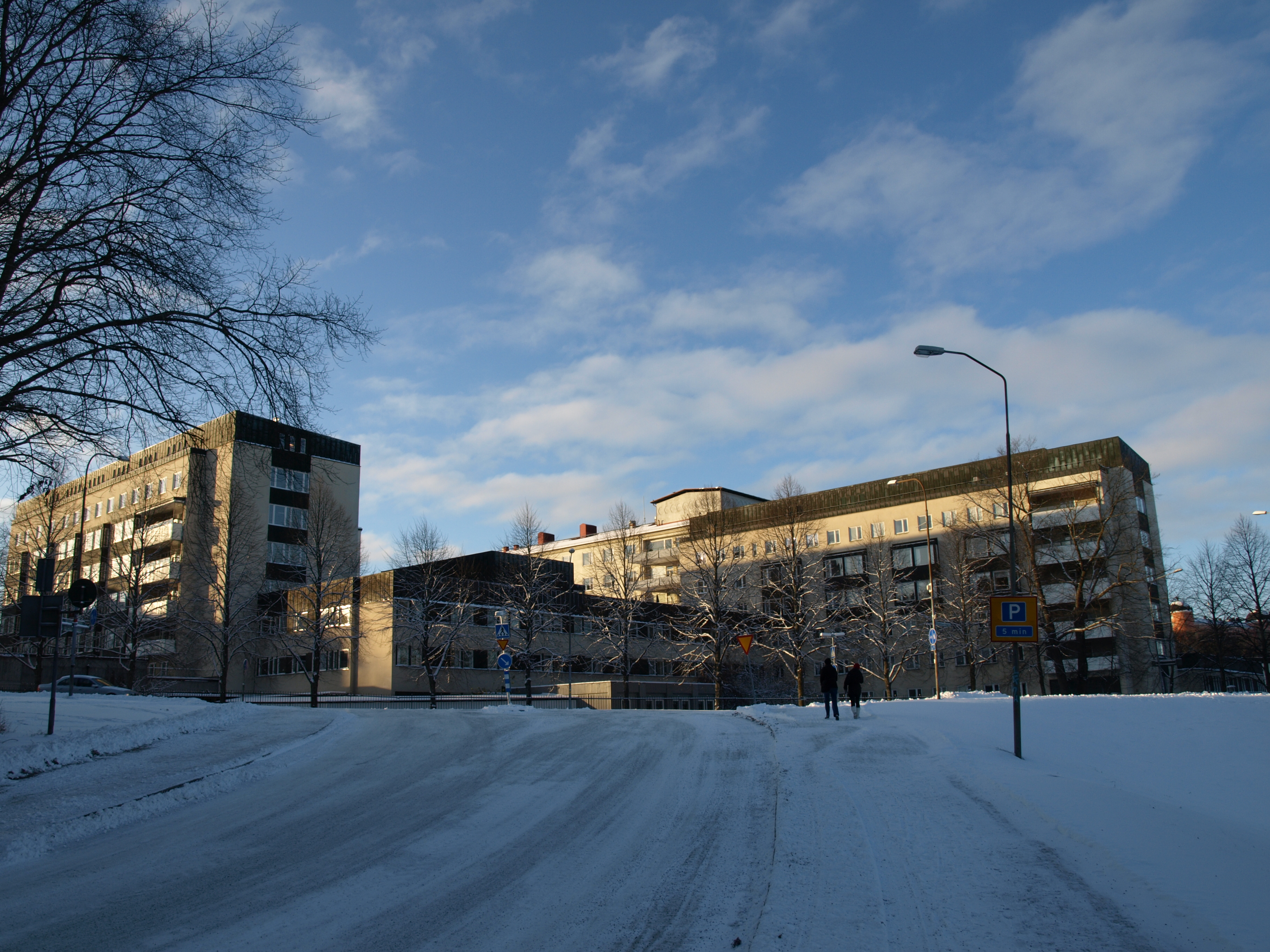

Geography
- Location: Uppsala, Sweden
- Coordinates: 59°50′50″N 17°38′25″E

Organisation
- Care system: Public
- Type: Teaching
- Affiliated university: Uppsala University

Services
- Emergency department: Trauma center
- Beds: 940

History
- Founded: 1302; 1708 University Clinic; 1850 Merger

Links
- Website: http://www.akademiska.se/
- Lists: Hospitals in Sweden

Uppsala University Hospital (Swedish: Akademiska sjukhuset, often referred to colloquially as "Akademiska" or "Ackis") in Uppsala, Sweden, is a teaching hospital for the Uppsala University Faculty of Medicine and the Nursing School. Uppsala University Hospital is owned and operated by the Uppsala County Council in cooperation with the university and serves, together with Enköping hospital in Enköping, as the primary hospitals for Uppsala County. It also fills the function of a tertiary referral hospital for the Uppsala/Örebro health care region and, for certain specialities, a tertiary referral hospital for the entire country of Sweden.

== History ==
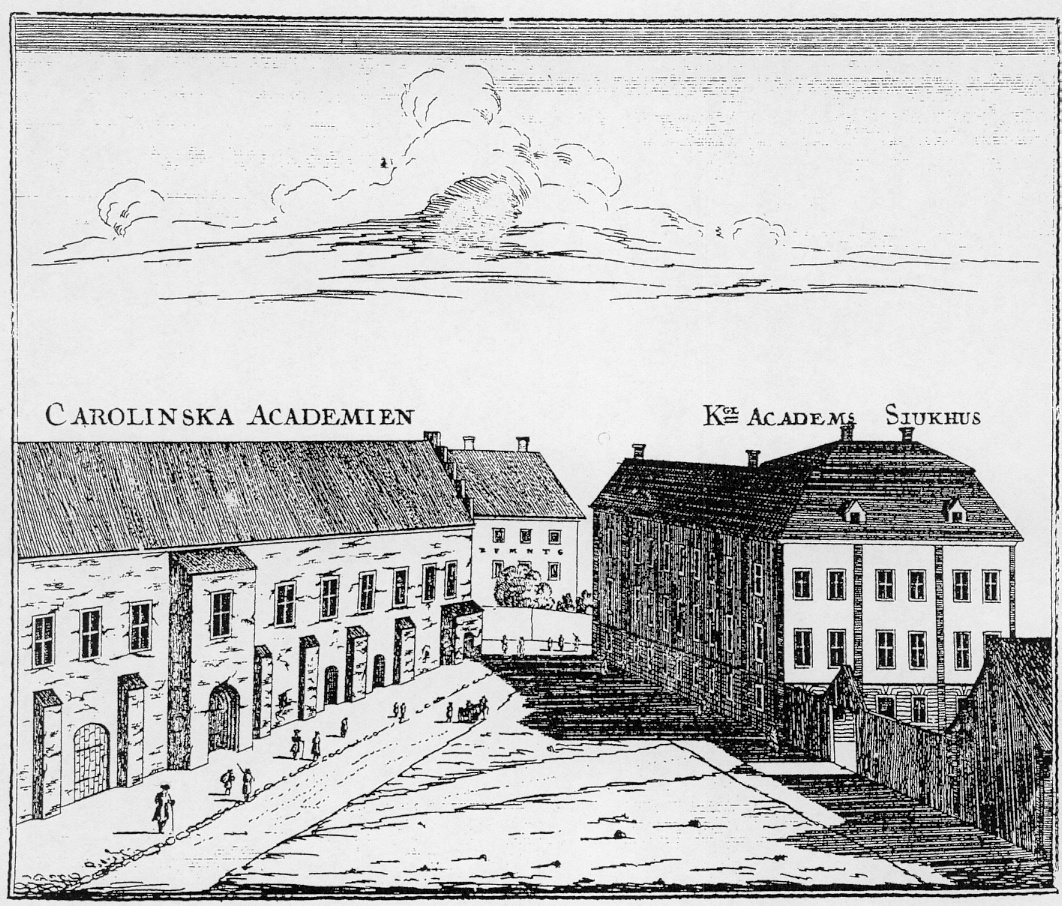
"Kgl. Academ[ien]s sjukhus", also known as the Nosocomium Academicum (in the Oxenstierna Palace), is seen to the right in this 1769 engraving by F. Akrelius. To the left the old chapter house, later used by the university and renamed Academia Carolina.

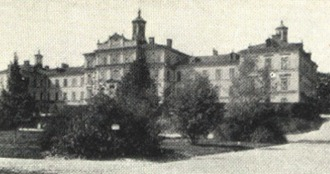
The old main building of the Uppsala University Hospital, photograph from c. 1920. This building, although modernized, is still in use.

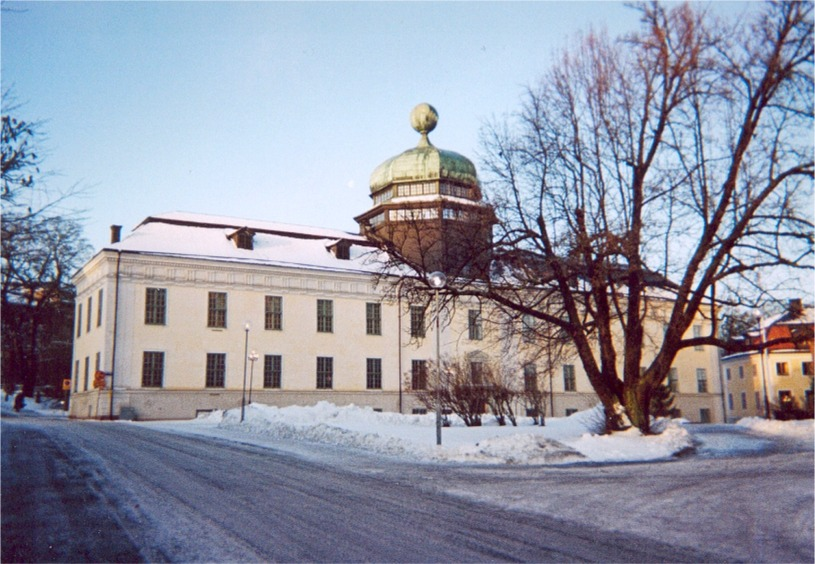
Gustavianum in Uppsala, showing the cupola housing Rudbeck's anatomical theatre from 1663

The university hospital has its origins in two older hospitals: one was founded in 1302 and is older than the university, the other one was founded for the Faculty of Medicine in 1708. These were merged in 1850.

The earliest hospital in Uppsala was founded in 1302. This was used for 400 years until the great fire of 1702, which destroyed large parts of central Uppsala. A new hospital, which later became the Uppsala county hospital, was built in its place, but was moved out of the town in 1811.

The university hospital as such was founded in 1708 as the first clinic with the specific intention of facilitating the practical education of medical students. Known as the Nosocomium Academicum, it was located in the Oxenstierna Palace at Riddartorget, beside the cathedral (see illustration). The building (the former residence of the President of the Royal Chancellery Bengt Gabrielsson Oxenstierna) today houses the Uppsala University Faculty of Law.

The present Akademiska sjukhuset was established in 1850 as an organizational merger of the county hospital and the university clinic, and a new building was inaugurated in 1867 on the hill below Uppsala Castle to the southeast. From this building, which is still in use, the present hospital complex has grown.

In 1663 medical professor and amateur architect Olaus Rudbeck designed the anatomical theatre located in the Gustavianum, which at the time served as the main building of Uppsala University. Rudbeck had spent some time at Leiden University, and both the anatomical theatre and the Uppsala University Botanical Garden he founded in Uppsala in 1655 were influenced by his experiences. Today Gustavianum is still in use for lectures and conferences, and also hosts a museum, Museum Gustavianum, open to visitors.

== Facilities ==
As of 2017, the hospital has around 8,300 employees and 940 beds.

In addition, the hospital also has:

- several business entities, including:
  - an ATM
  - cafeterias, kiosks, restaurants and shops
  - a pharmacy (Apoteket)
- a 40-bed hotel for patients and relatives
- a chaplaincy (staffed by the Church of Sweden)
- a hospital library which serves as a public library

== Organization ==
The present hospital director is Lennart Persson, and the medical directors are Margareta Öhrvall, M.D. and Bengt Sandén, M.D.

=== Divisions ===
The following are divisions under the hospital director:

- Diagnostics, Anesthesia and Technology Division
- Emergency and Rehabilitation Division
- Oncology, Thorax and Medical Division
- Neurology Division
- Psychiatry Division
- Surgery Division
- Women's Health and Pediatrics Division

=== Departments ===
- Specialities
  - Anaesthesiology and Main Operating Theatres
  - Antenatal Centre
  - Audiology
  - Burn Unit
  - Cardiology
  - Clinical Physiology
  - Centre for Gynecology and Obstetrics
  - Centre for Laboratory Medicine
  - Uppsala University Children's Hospital
    - Clinical genetics
    - International Child Health Care
    - Pediatric Medicine
    - Paediatric Oncology
    - Pediatric Orthopaedics
    - Pediatric Surgery
  - Clinical Chemistry
  - Clinical Microbiology
  - Clinical Pathology
  - Clinical Pharmacology
  - Dermatology and Venereology
  - Endocrinology and Diabetes Care
  - Emergency Department
  - Endocrine oncology
  - ENT (Ear, Nose, Throat)
  - General Internal Medicine
  - Geriatrics
  - Gastroenterology
  - Haematology
  - Hepatology
  - Hospital Physics
  - Immunology and Transfusion Medicine
  - Infectious Diseases
  - Lung Medicine
  - National Centre for Battered and Raped Women
  - Nephrology
  - Neurology
  - Neurophysiology
  - Neurosurgery
  - Occupational and Environmental Medicine
  - Occupational Therapy
  - Oncology
  - Ophthalmology
  - Orthopaedics
  - Phoniatrics
  - Physiotherapy
  - Psychiatry
    - Adult Psychiatry
    - Geriatric Psychiatry
    - Pediatric and Adolescent Psychiatry
  - Radiology
  - Rehabilitation
  - Reproduction Centre
  - Rheumatology
  - Social Medicine
  - Surgery
    - Otosurgery
    - Plastic Surgery and Oral and Maxillofacial Surgery
    - Thoracic Anaesthesiology
    - Thoracic Surgery
    - Transplantation Surgery
  - Toxicomania
  - Urology
- Specialized Centres
  - Centre for Clinical Medical Research
  - Centre for Eating Disorders
  - Centre for Cystic Fibrosis
  - Centre for Down's Syndrome
  - Uppsala Centre of Excellence in Aorta
  - Uppsala Centre of Excellence in Neuroendocrine Tumors
  - National Centre for Battered and Raped Women
  - Pain Centre
  - Trauma Centre
  - Wound Centre

=== Svedberg Laboratory ===
The Svedberg Laboratory is a university facility that contains the Gustaf Werner cyclotron, which is used for research as well as for proton therapy for the treatment of cancer with close cooperation with the oncology clinic at Uppsala University Hospital. Such an accelerator and its gantries costs between $60 million and $100 million, and makes Uppsala University Hospital one of the approximately 40 centers in the word to provide such cancer treatment.

=== Uppsala University Children's Hospital ===
Uppsala University Children's Hospital (Swedish: Akademiska barnsjukhuset) was formed in 1991 with the merger of the departments of paediatrics, paediatric surgery, paediatric orthopaedic surgery and clinical genetics. The children's hospital also has a Paediatric Oncology department with 14 beds and a rehabilitation centre called the Folke Bernadotte Home with 20 beds.

=== Uppsala Centre of Excellence in Neuroendocrine Tumors ===
Since the 1970s, there has been a special emphasis on endocrine tumors at Uppsala University Hospital. The department of Endocrine oncology has been seeing and treating about 3000 patients with endocrine tumors, making it the largest of the six centers of excellence recognized by the European Neuroendocrine Tumor Society (ENETS).

=== Mobile Intensive Care Units ===
==== Helicopter Borne Intensive Care Unit ====
Uppsala University Hospital also has a helicopter borne intensive care unit. The current equipment is a Eurocopter Dauphin N3 equipped as a one-bed intensive care unit (2010). The helicopter is crewed by two IFR licensed pilots, with medical personnel consisting of a doctor and a nurse both specializing in intensive care and anesthesia. Crew members in other specialities are brought along, as needed by the mission. The helicopter is mainly used for transports between hospitals in Sweden and Finland but also serves the Uppsala County area with helicopter emergency medical care within a range of 100 km from the hospital.

==== Fixed Wing Intensive Care Unit ====
In addition to the short range mobile intensive care provided by the helicopter, Uppsala University Hospital owns a Bombardier Learjet 45. The aircraft is equipped by LifePort and capable of providing long range intensive care transports of up to two patients on stretchers or in incubators. The plane is crewed by two pilots and medical personnel in appropriate specialities for the mission.

== Education ==
Uppsala University Hospital provides a major part of the medical education (organized by the Uppsala University Faculty of Medicine) and nurse training in Uppsala.

== Uppsala Care ==
Uppsala University Hospital also offers its services to foreign citizens (non-swedes) under the service organization called "Uppsala Care". Specialities which are offered to foreigners include:

- Endocrine oncology
- Clinic for Internal Medicine, diabetes and other endocrine disorders, haematology, hepatology
- Gynecological endocrinology and infertility
- Immune deficiency diseases
- Neuro Centre, neurology, neurophysiology
- Neurosurgery, occupational therapy, rehabilitation
- Prosthesis
- Rehabilitation of spinal cord injuries
- Surgical treatment and radio therapy for cancer
- Thoracic Centre, invasive cardiology including angioplasty and arrhythmia ablation, thoracic and lung surgery
- Transplantation (bone marrow, liver, kidney, pancreas)
- Urology diseases
- Vascular surgery
