= The Svedberg Laboratory =

Coordinates: 59.8537°N 17.6254°E

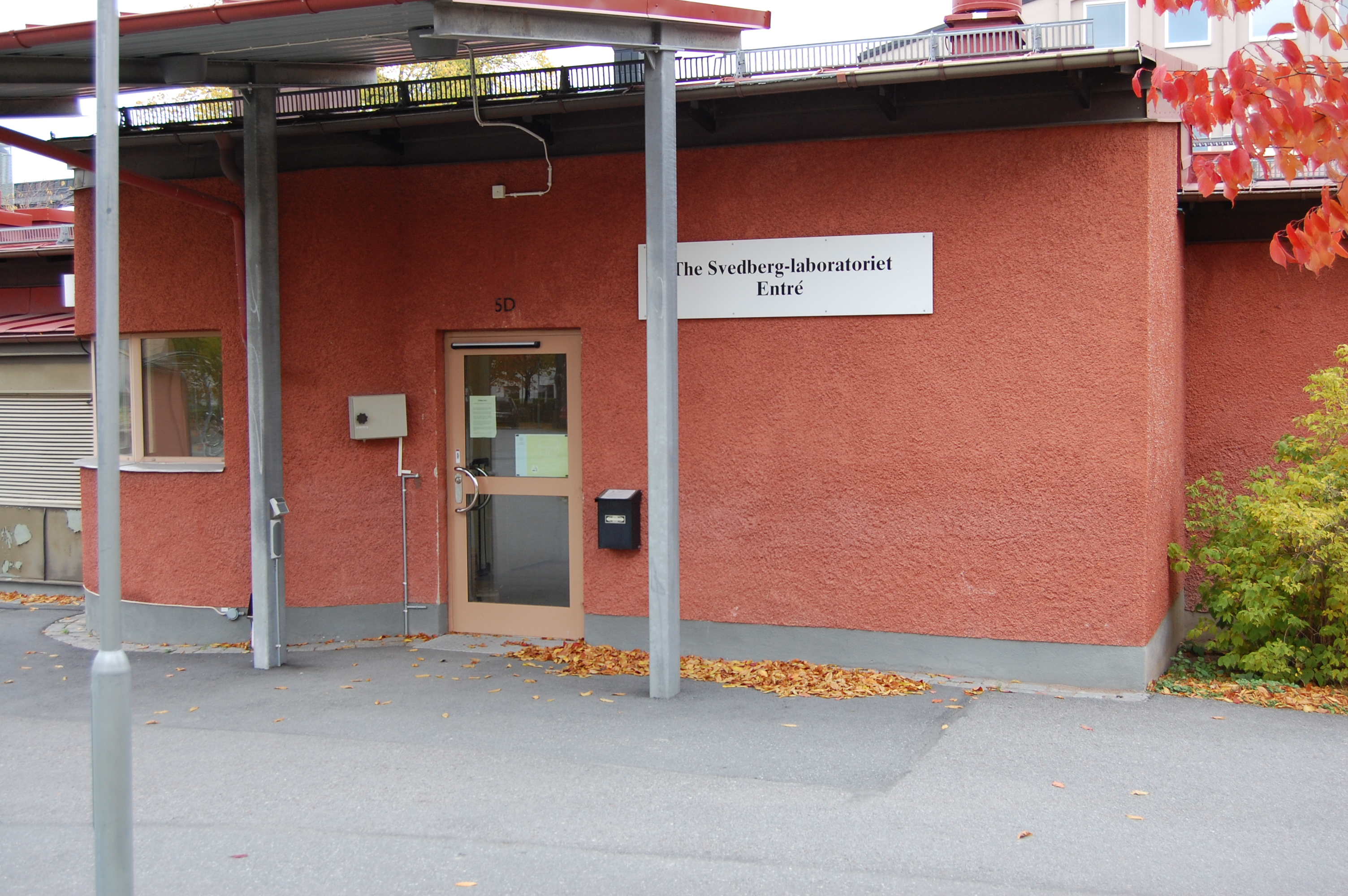
The Svedberg Laboratory in October 2016

The Svedberg Laboratory (TSL) is a university facility, based in Uppsala, Sweden. It is under Decommission since 2016. The activities at TSL were based around the particle accelerator Gustaf Werner cyclotron.

The main activity was proton therapy for the treatment of cancer, based on an agreement between the Oncology clinic at Uppsala University Hospital and Uppsala University. Beamtime not used for proton therapy was devoted to commercial neutron and proton irradiation projects, mainly for Radiation testing. There was also some time for basic (academic) research and in this case the experiments should be associated to Uppsala University or to EC projects.

TSL was supported by the European Community and belonged to the EC projects ERINDA, SkyFlash and CHANDA.

== History ==
Theodor Svedberg (1884–1971), professor in physical chemistry at Uppsala University from 1912 to 1949, was awarded the Nobel Prize in chemistry in 1926 for his research on dispersed systems (colloidal solutions). He invented the Ultracentrifuge, which was used in the discovery that proteins consist of macromolecules.

Towards the end of the 1930s The Svedberg and his colleagues built their first accelerator, a Neutron generator. In 1945, a donation from the Gustaf Werner Corporation gave the opportunity to build a much larger accelerator, a synchrocyclotron. The Gustaf Werner Institute with the synchrocyclotron as the main research instrument was founded in 1949 and continued to act as a base for research in high-energy physics and radiation biology until 1986 when The Svedberg Laboratory was established.

Intensive discussions concerning the type and size of accelerators Swedish research in nuclear and high-energy physics should have at its disposal took place in the early 1980s, One result of this process was that a decision was taken to bring the magnets of the so-called ICE-ring (Initial Cooling Experiment) from CERN to Uppsala. The accelerator ring was rebuilt as a cooler and storage ring and given the acronym CELSIUS (Cooling with ELectrons and Storing of Ions from the Uppsala Synchrocyclotron).

From 1994 until 2004 The Svedberg Laboratory was a national research facility funded to a large fraction from the Swedish Natural Science Research Council (Swedish Research Council). It was open for research groups from universities and institutes in Sweden and abroad. The laboratory had a nationally recruited board and an international program advisory committee, which gave recommendations concerning the research program by examining proposals from the user groups. Uppsala University was acting as the host of the Laboratory.

The TSL was in 2004 converted from a national laboratory into a university facility and new instructions for the laboratory came into operation July 1, 2004. The main activity of TSL was now based on an agreement between Uppsala University Hospital and Uppsala University about continued proton therapy. The beamtime not used for proton therapy was devoted to commercial neutron and proton irradiation projects. There was still some time for basic (academic) research and in this case the experiments should be associated to Uppsala University or to EU projects.

The hospital moved their proton therapy treatments to a new built facility in 2015, The Skandion Clinic. Uppsala University then made the decision to close down and decommission the Accelerator Laboratory. Last beam out of the cyclotron was in June 2016.

The decommission is still ongoing and is planned to be finished in 2026.

== Proton therapy ==
The proton beam extracted from a cyclotron may have exclusive advantages in treatment of certain human malignant tumours and some other disorders where conventional radiation therapy or surgery is not feasible. The depth dose distribution, with the Bragg peak, and the relatively sharp penumbra, enables the concentration of radiation to the target volume and minimizes the dose to normal tissue surrounding the target. Proton beam irradiation may lead to cure or shrinkage of tumour burden in cases where other treatment modalities fail. All patients are carefully investigated by computerized tomography and/or magnetic resonance imaging in order to obtain a detailed knowledge of the position and size of the tumour. Angiography and positron emission tomography will be used in certain cases. Before the treatments, careful radiation treatment planning is performed to ensure an optimal dose distribution. Treatments that were performed at TSL:

- Eye melanomas. The first patient was treated in April 1989 with a modified 72 MeV beam to 54,5 Gy in 4 fractions using a single field technique.
- Arteriovenous malformation (AVM) of the brain. The first patient with superficially located inoperable AVM:s was treated in April 1991 with a modified 100 MeV beam utilizing two portals to a total dose of 20 Gy in two fractions.
- Therapy with protons beams in patients with Uveal melanomas and meningeomas in the brain.
- Proton beam therapy as a boost to photon beam therapy in patients with malignant tumours.
- Malignant gliomas. Patients with astrocytomas grade III and IV have received irradiation treatment with photons and protons.
- Meningeomas of the brain. Patients with partially resected meningiomas, WHO grade I, in the brain have been treated since 1994. The treatment is generally given four fractions to a total dose of 24 Gy.
- Tumours in the head-and-neck region, tumours in the base of the skull and adenomas in the pituitary. Most patients have received a combined therapy with photons and protons.
- The first patient with Prostate cancer was treated in late 2002, with 180 MeV. A special couch/platform was built for this purpose (see picture above).
- In 2008 Barncancerfonden (The Swedish Childhood Cancer Foundation) funded construction of an adjustable treatment couch adapted for lying child patients (see picture above) and adjustment of software used for treatments.

In June 2015 the Uppsala University Hospital finished their treatments at TSL and moved over to Skandion, a new dedicated clinic for proton therapy in Uppsala, Sweden.

== Irradiation facilities for radiation testing ==
At TSL there were facilities with high-energy particle beams for different purposes. The users mostly used them for testing reliability of electronic equipment under radiation exposure, accelerated radiation testing. Other use has also been seen, such as biomedical research, material science and production of filters and other things.

The following facilities were available:

=== ANITA, the white spectrum neutron beam facility ===
Simulated the Cosmic ray induced neutron field. Designed for Single Event Effects/Soft Error Rate testing. It produced a neutron beam with spectrum that resembles the one in the Earth's atmosphere, and high neutron flux, up to 10^7/cm^2/s, and thus high acceleration factor. It had variable flux and beam spot size and shape according to user specifications. Another asset was having a spacious user area with >50 m^{2}.

=== QMN, the quasi-monoenergetic neutron beam facility ===
QMN made it possible to study the energy dependence of neutron-induced effects in electronics. It had selectable neutron energy in the 20-175 MeV energy range with variable flux, up to 3*10^8 neutrons per second over the beam area and variable beam spot size. An additional asset is spacious user area, >50 m^{2}, where quite large equipment could be set up for tests.

=== PAULA, the proton beam facility ===
PAULA was a proton beam facility for Single Event Effects & Total Ionisation Dose testing. It produced selectable proton energy in the 20-180 MeV energy range with high, variable proton flux and a variable, uniform beam spot size.

=== Heavy Ions facility ===
During the years the cyclotron have delivered heavy ions for research and industrial projects. The cyclotron then used an external ion source, an ECRIS, for preacceleration of heavy ions.

== Technical overview ==
=== Particle accelerator ===
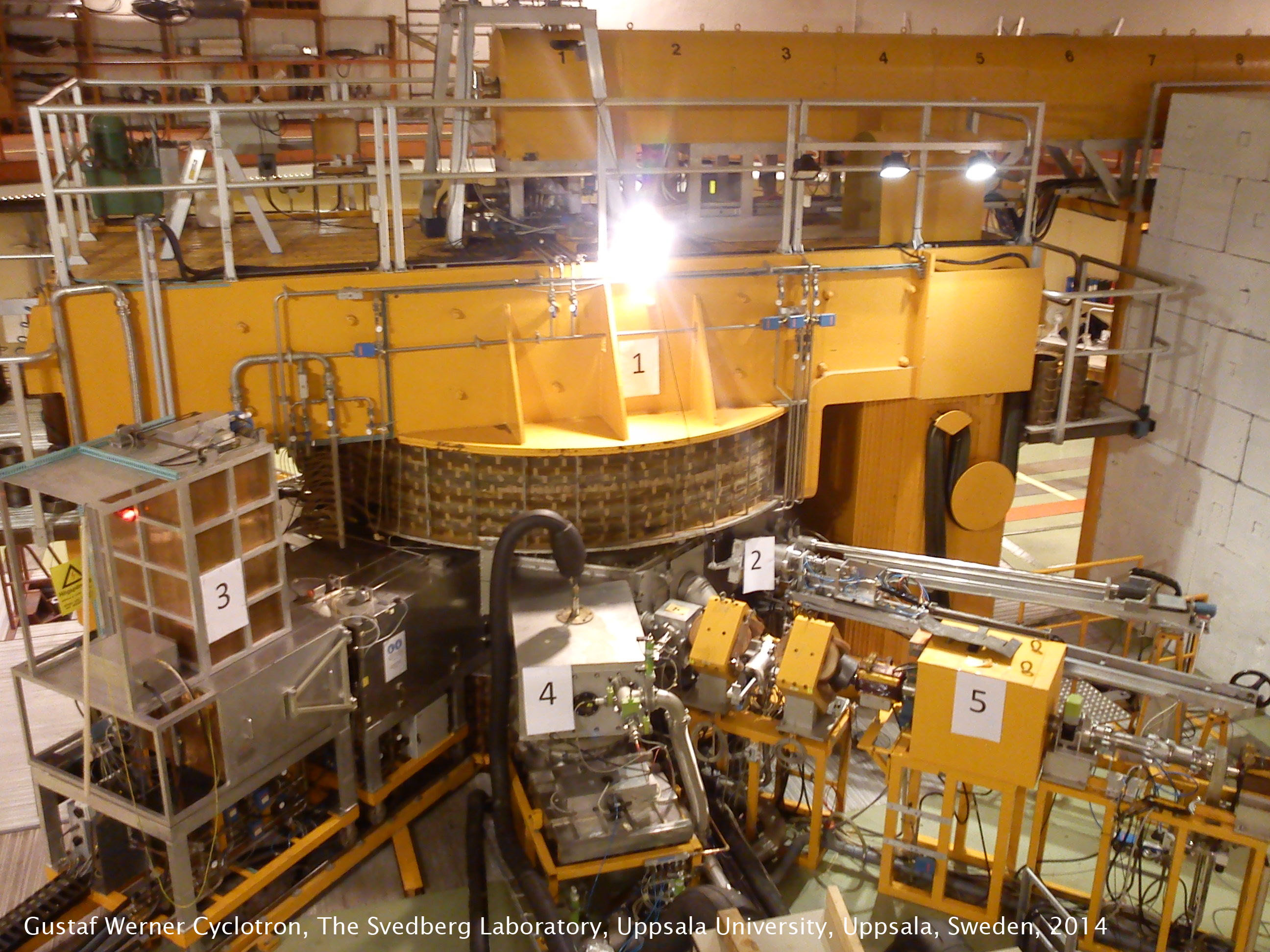
The Gustaf Werner Cyclotron at The Svedberg Laboratory, Uppsala University, Uppsala, Sweden.

Machine is named the Gustaf Werner Cyclotron. The machine was designed in house and constructed during 1946–51 with first beam in 1951. The machine was then rebuilt 1977–86 with first beam in 1986.

=== Beamlines ===
There were several beamlines at TSL: The A-line was used for nuclide production, was not used for several years before close down but was in running condition til the end. The B-line was in commonly use for delivering proton beam for irradiation testing. The C-line was used for biomedical research with different heavy ions. The D-line was commonly used for delivering proton beam for production of neutron beams for irradiation testing. The G-line was commonly used for delivering proton beam for proton therapy.

== Laboratory directors ==
- Arne Johansson, Professor emeritus, 1986–1992
- Leif Nilssson, Professor emeritus, 1993–1998
- Curt Ekström, Professor emeritus, 1998–2008
- Björn Gålnander, Ph.D., 2008–2015

== Scanditronix AB ==
The company Scanditronix AB, which later was acquired by General Electric Healthcare in 1991, designs cyclotrons partially based on research at TSL.
