= Argentaffin =

Argentaffin refers to cells which take up silver stain.

Enteroendocrine cells are sometimes also called "argentaffins" because they take up this stain. An argentaffin cell is any enteroendocrine cell, a hormone-secreting cell present throughout the digestive tract.

It is a property of melanin, and special stain can be applied to identify those granules. Fontana–Masson stain uses the fact that those cells can reduce the silver salts to metallic silver (brownish-black) color without the aid of reducing agent, which is the definition of Argentaffin cells.

Argentaffin cells , one of the round or partly flattened cells occurring in the lining tissue of the digestive tract and containing granules thought to be of secretory function. These epithelial cells, though common throughout the digestive tract, are most concentrated in the small intestine and appendix. The cells located randomly within the mucous membrane lining of the intestine and in tubelike depressions in that lining known as the Lieberkühn glands. Their granules contain a chemical called serotonin, which stimulates smooth muscle contractions. Functionally, it is believed that serotonin diffuses out of the argentaffin cells into the walls of the digestive tract, where neurons leading to the muscles are stimulated to produce the wavelike contractions of peristalsis. Peristaltic movements encourage the passage of food substances through the intestinal tract.

The mucosa of bronchi contains numerous neuroendocrine cells which are bronchial counterparts of argentaffin cells of alimentary canal....
