= Atypical pulmonary carcinoid tumour =

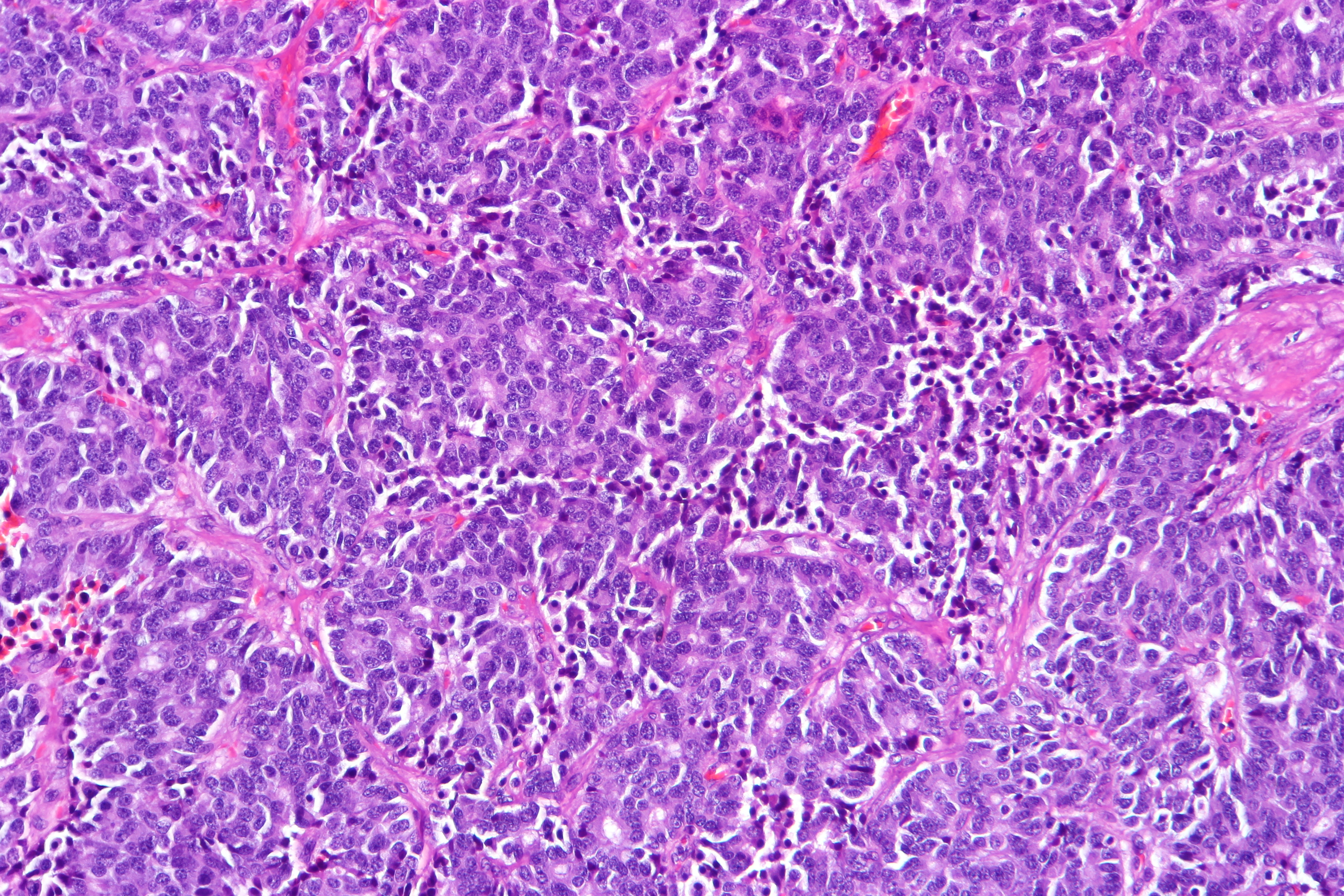
- Atypical pulmonary carcinoid. H&E stain.
- Specialty: Oncology

Atypical pulmonary carcinoid tumour is a subtype of pulmonary carcinoid tumor. It is an uncommon low-grade malignant lung mass that is most often in the central airways of the lung. It is also known as "atypical lung carcinoid tumour", " atypical lung carcinoid" or "moderately differentiated neuroendocrine carcinoma".

It is a more aggressive than typical carcinoid tumors: nodal metastases in 70% vs. 5%. The 5 year survival is 49-69%.

Atypical carcinoid tumors have increased mitotic activity (2-10 per 10 HPF), nuclear pleomorphism or foci of necrosis.

== Morphological differential diagnosis ==
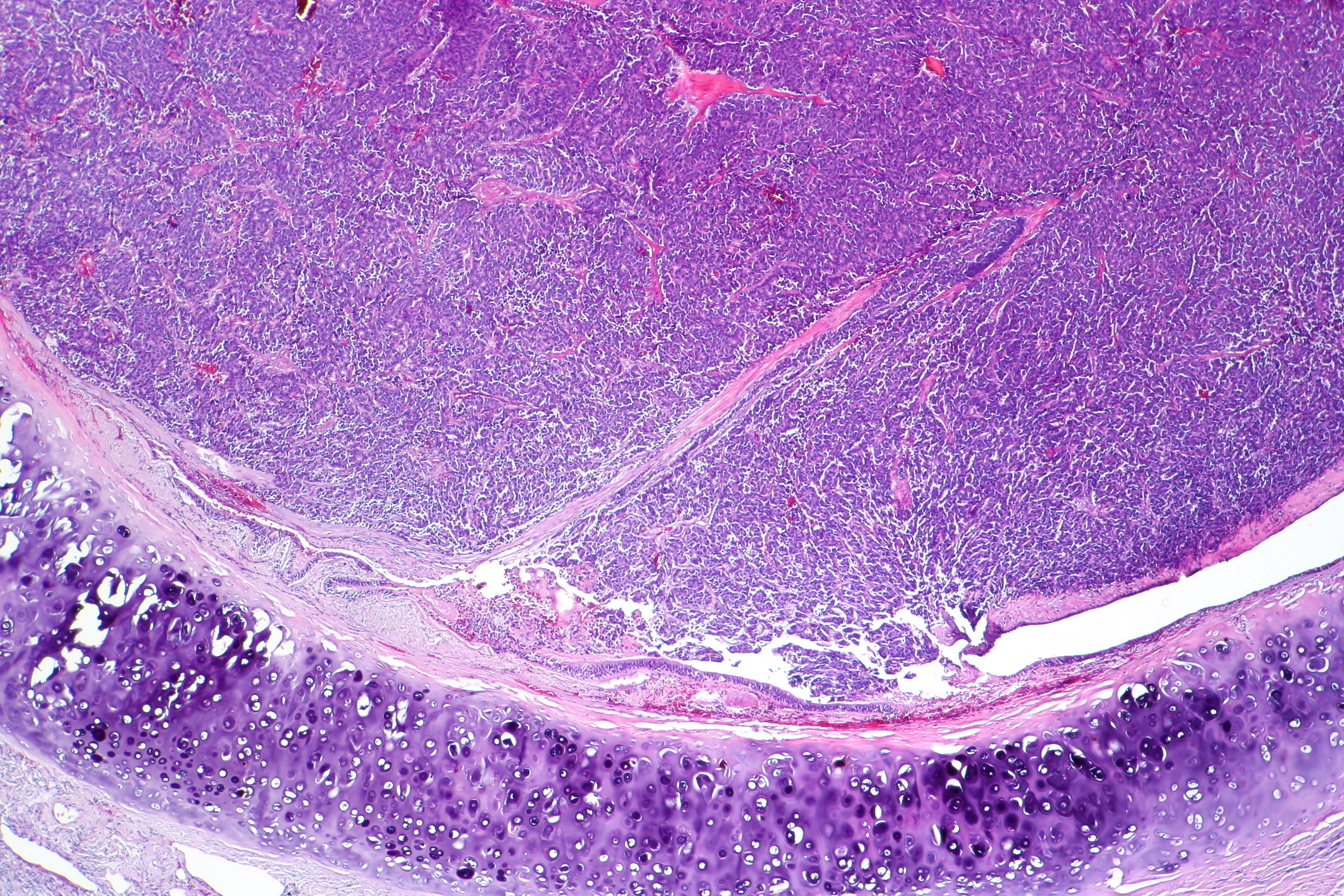
Atypical carcinoid of the lung exhibiting endobronchial growth, increased mitotic activity was seen (2-10 per 10 HPF). H&E stain.

- Typical pulmonary carcinoid tumor
  - Typical pulmonary carcinoid lacks comedo-like necrosis, and has < 0.2 mitotic figures/HPF.
