= Neuroendocrine carcinoma of the cervix =

Neuroendocrine carcinoma of the cervix is best defined separately:Neuroendocrine: Of, relating to, or involving the interaction between the nervous system and the hormones of the endocrine glands.Carcinoma: An invasive malignant tumor derived from epithelial tissue that tends to metastasize to other areas of the body.

== Types ==
There are two types of neuroendocrine carcinomas of the cervix: small-cell and large-cell.

=== Small-cell carcinoma (SCC) ===
Small-cell carcinoma (SCC) of the cervix is an exceptional member of the neuroendocrine group of cervical carcinomas that is frequently intermixed with a non-SCC component in the form of an adenocarcinoma (ADC) or squamous carcinoma. SCC is an aggressive tumor that spreads very quickly early on; this leads to a fatal clinical course and minimal chances of survival for the patients. It resembles small-cell cancer of the lungs and accounts for less than 3% of all cervical cancers. Like small-cell cancer in the lungs, the lymph nodes play a major role in spreading the cancer throughout the body. SCC begins in the inner part of the cervix and is very hard to diagnose. Due to the involvement of the lymph nodes, in its late and fatal stages, it can spread beyond the pelvic region to other organs. The prevalence of the lymph nodes involvement and that systemic metastasis is much higher in SCC than in non-SCC, thus more complex treatments are required for SCC. “Because of the distinct natural history of small cell carcinoma of the uterine cervix, and because patients with this condition are considered to have a systemic disease, the treatment strategies for this disease are different from those of other carcinomas” (ajronline.org). According to a report (Yang, et al. 2003), multi-agent chemotherapy and pelvic radiotherapy before surgery (radical hysterectomy) followed by chemotherapy after surgery produce better outcomes for its patients. Unfortunately, Pap smears alone are not adequate for the diagnosis of SCC; patients may be misdiagnosed with non-SCC on the basis of Pap smear results alone. Imaging studies are necessary for proper diagnosis; it has been proposed that MRI is the highest standard for the imaging evaluation of uterine cervical cancer. The major problem with early accurate diagnosis of SCC is the limitation of routine screening, namely the Pap smear.

=== Large-cell carcinoma (LCC) ===
Large-cell carcinoma (LCC), like small-cell carcinoma (SCC) is very rare and only accounts for about 5% of all cervical cancers. Early-stage LCC are extremely aggressive and difficult to diagnose due to the sub-mucosal location of the tumor and intact overlying mucosa. As with SCC, in LCC early cases are asymptomatic. Later stages present with irregular bleeding, vaginal spotting, discharge, and pelvic pain. The basis for treatment of LCC tumors is derived from therapy used for SCC; when diagnosed, multimodal therapy should be considered just as with SCC.

== Causes ==
It has been observed that HPV18 is the most prevalent type in Small cell cervical cancer. Like other types of cervical cancer it seems to be associated with high-risk (e.g. 16, 18, 31) HPV Infection.

== Diagnosis ==
=== Classification ===
Neuroendocrine carcinoma affects many different parts of the body.

In the cervix, it is a rare, but very aggressive form of cervical cancer. In its early stages, neuroendocrine carcinoma is asymptomatic (not showing or producing indications of a disease or other medical condition). In more advanced stages, symptoms of Neuroendocrine carcinoma of the cervix are: abnormal vaginal bleeding, increased vaginal discharge, and pelvic pain, painful urination, pain during sex, tiredness, leg swelling, and backache. When left untreated, metastasis or even death may occur.

== Prognosis ==
Cervical cancers can recur with symptoms of vaginal bleeding and/or discharge, pelvic pain, pain in the back and legs, leg swelling (edema), chronic cough and weight loss. It can recur in the vagina, pelvis, lymph nodes, lung, or liver. “If radiation was not given previously, recurrences that are confined to the pelvis may be treated with external beam radiation with chemotherapy and intracavitary or interstitial radiation therapy. If radiation therapy was already given, the only option is the removal of the vagina, uterus, and the bladder and/or rectum with the creation of an artificial bladder-a pelvic exenteration. The five-year survival rate after a pelvic exenteration is about 50 percent.” (womenscancercenter.com) Chemotherapy is useful in women with recurrent tumors which cannot be removed surgically or in women with metastatic diseases. Chances of survival of chemotherapy, if diagnosed in early stage, is greater than 50%.
