= Predictive marker =

Indicator of efficacy of a therapy

A predictive marker is a particular protein or gene that indicates sensitivity or resistance to a specific therapy. The use of predictive markers is becoming increasingly relevant in cancer therapy as it allows for better identification of patients who will respond positively to the therapy. In the clinical setting, predictive markers are limited to use in breast cancer. Expression of estrogen and progesterone receptors can determine the benefits of hormone therapy, whilst the benefit of treating breast cancer patients with herceptin (Trastuzumab) is determined by the expression of HER2. There are many advantages to utilizing a predictive marker in cancer therapy including better patient management minimizing unnecessary suffering from side effects with ultimately the wrong treatment choice, reducing loss of precious time whilst determining whether a therapy will provide any benefit, and a reduction in cost to both the patient and the wider health community.
