= Salt-and-pepper chromatin =

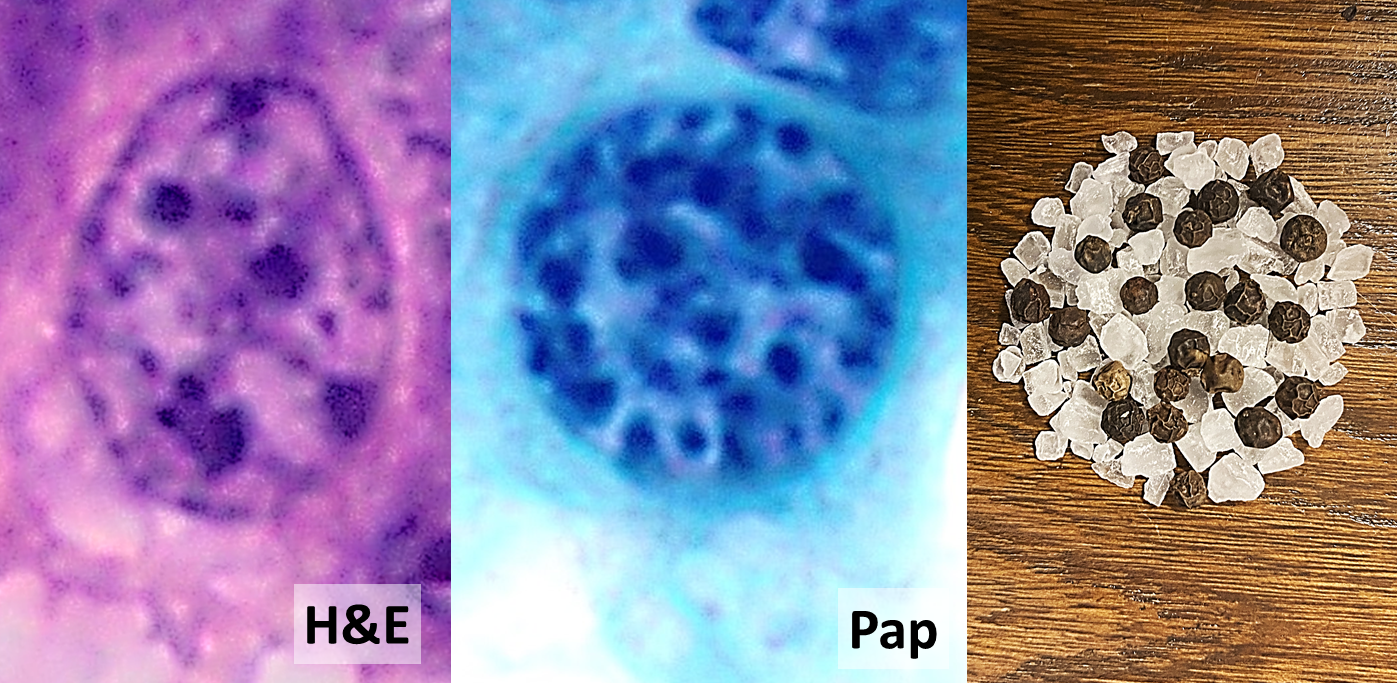
Well-differentiated neuroendocrine tumor with salt-and-pepper chromatin, seen on H&E stain and Pap stain, and actual salt and pepper for comparison.

In pathology, salt-and-pepper chromatin, also known as salt-and-pepper nuclei or stippled chromatin, refers to cell nuclei that demonstrate granular chromatin when observed via light microscopy.

Salt-and-pepper chromatin is typically seen in endocrine tumours such as medullary thyroid carcinoma, neuroendocrine tumours and pheochromocytoma.

== Additional images ==
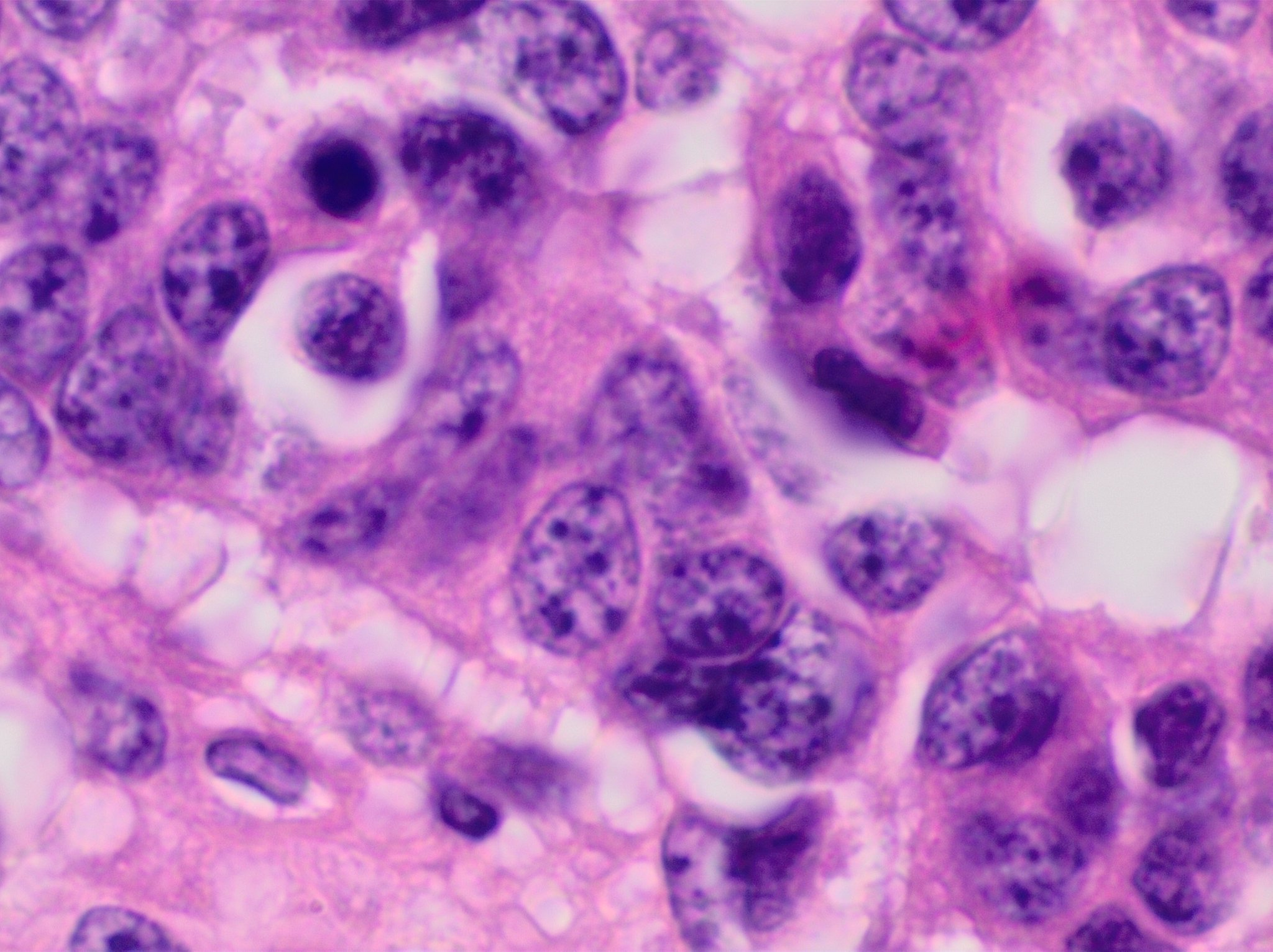
Neuroendocrine tumour of the lung with salt-and-pepper chromatin. H&E stain.

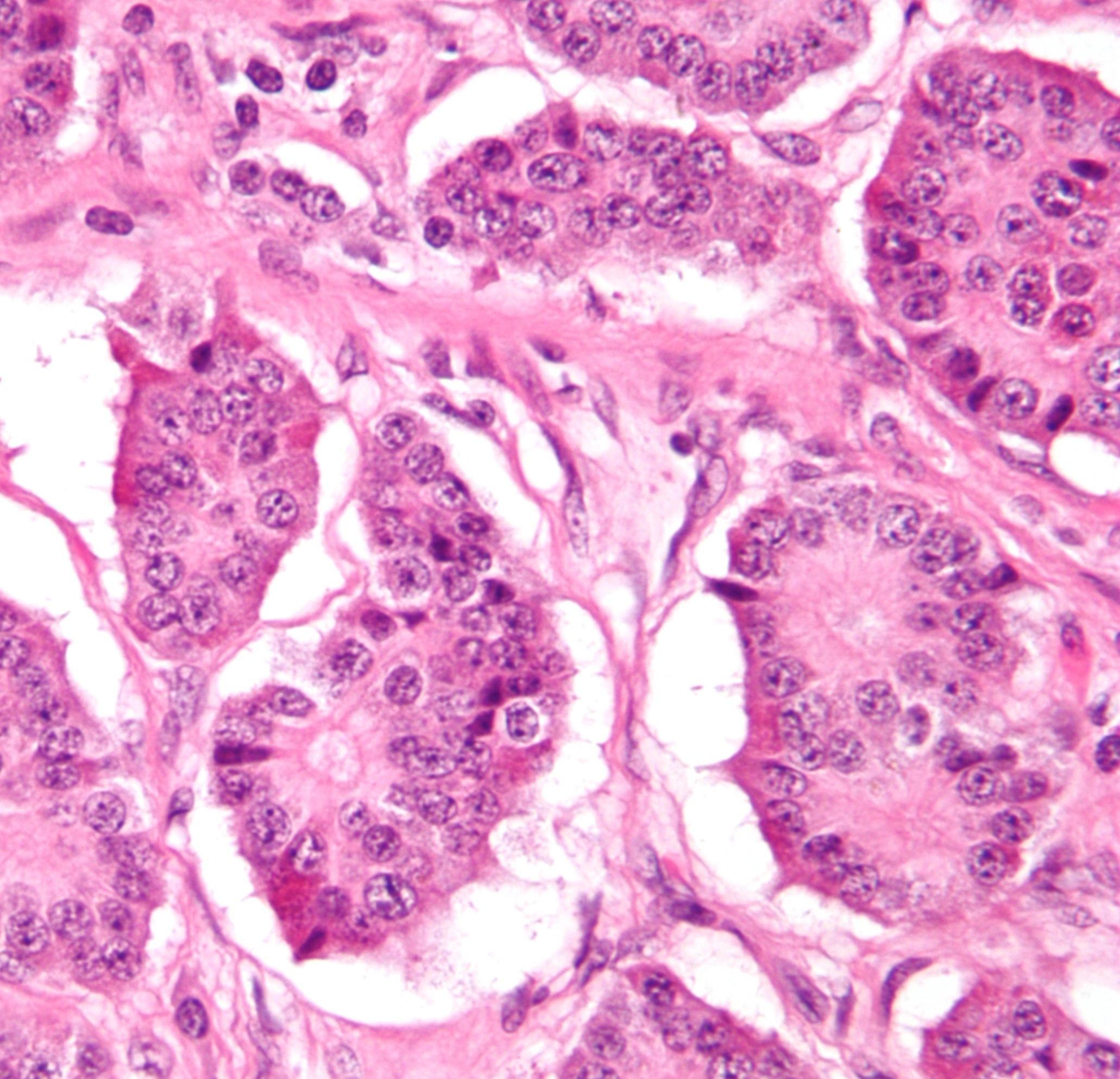
Neuroendocrine tumour of the small intestine with salt-and-pepper chromatin. H&E stain.

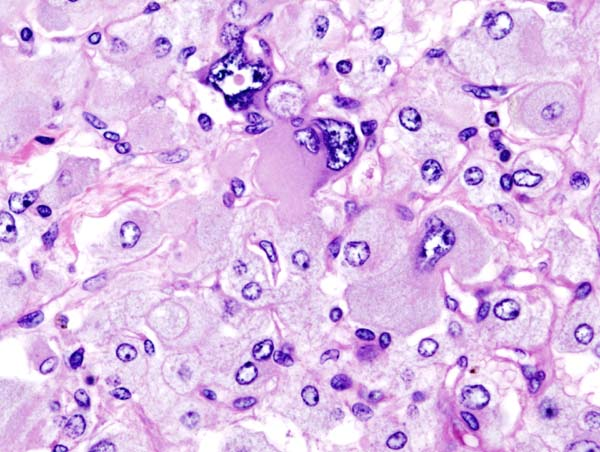
A pheochromocytoma showing finely granular chromatin. H&E stain.

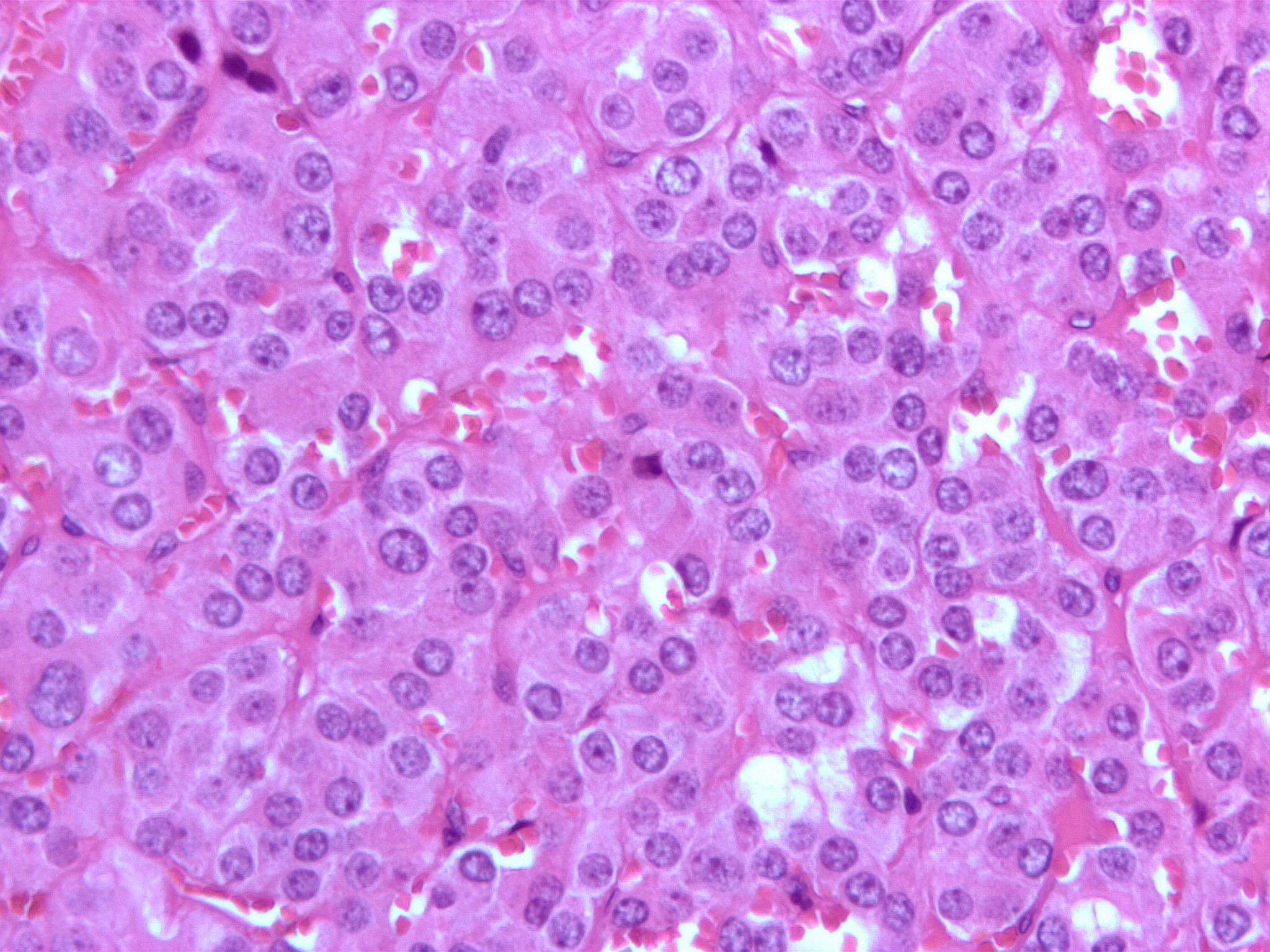
Salt-and-pepper chromatin (pheochromocytoma). H&E stain.
