= Large cell neuroendocrine carcinoma of the lung =

Human disease

Large-cell neuroendocrine carcinoma of the lung (LCNEC of the lung), or pulmonary large-cell neuroendocrine carcinoma (PLCNC), is a highly malignant neoplasm arising from transformed epithelial cells originating in tissues within the pulmonary tree. It is currently considered to be a subtype of large-cell lung carcinoma.

LCNEC is often generically grouped among the non-small-cell lung carcinomas.

LCNECs often have inactivations of p53 and RB (~40%), or inactivation of TP53 and STK11 or KEAP1 (~40%).

== Variants ==
The World Health Organization classification of lung tumors recognizes a variant of LCNEC, namely "combined large-cell neuroendocrine carcinoma" (c-LCNEC).
