= Alpha cell hyperplasia =

- Specialty: Gastroenterology

Alpha cell hyperplasia is defined as a specific (without similar change in other islet cells), diffuse (not limited to a particular part of pancreas), and overwhelming (many-fold) increase of the number of pancreatic alpha cells. The pancreatic islets normally contain 4 types of cells; the alpha cells produce and release glucagon, a hormone that regulates the metabolism of glucose and amino acids. Although first described in early 1990s, alpha cell hyperplasia had remained an esoteric topic until the mid-2010s. Based on the pathogenesis and clinical presentation, alpha cell hyperplasia can be divided into 3 types: reactive, nonfunctional, and functional.

== Reactive alpha cell hyperplasia ==
Any means to inhibit normal glucagon signaling in any vertebrate animals tested so far (zebra fish, mice, monkeys, and humans) causes reactive alpha cell hyperplasia. There is a negative feedback loop linking the pancreatic alpha cells and the liver. When glucagon signaling is inhibited, the liver (the main target organ of glucagon) releases excess amounts of amino acids into the circulation (hyperaminoacidemia) which stimulate the alpha cells to proliferate and to produce and release more glucagon. Humans and animals with reactive alpha cell hyperplasia do not exhibit signs of glucagon excess as their glucagon signaling is inhibited at the first place. Reactive alpha cell hyperplasia is a preneoplastic lesion. Humans with inactivating glucagon mutations (i.e. Mahvash disease) and several murine models of reactive alpha cell hyperplasia all eventually develop pancreatic neuroendocrine tumors.

== Nonfunctional alpha cell hyperplasia ==
Nonfunctional and reactive alpha cell hyperplasia are indistinguishable histologically. Nonfunctional alpha cell hyperplasia, however, is not associated with hyperglucagonemia. The cause of nonfunctional alpha cell hyperplasia in humans requires further investigation. Nonfunctional alpha cell hyperplasia is also a preneoplastic lesion.

== Functional alpha cell hyperplasia ==
Functional alpha cell hyperplasia differs from reactive and nonfunctional alpha cell hyperplasia in that the functional alpha cell hyperplasia is associated with hyperglucagonemia and the hyperglucagonemia results in glucagonoma syndrome. Functional alpha cell hyperplasia is poorly characterized so far.

== See also ==
- Glucagon receptor
- Pancreatic neuroendocrine tumor
- Mahvash disease
