= Mahvash disease =

- Other names: Glucagon cell hyperplasia and neoplasia
- Photographic image of the numerous islets of various sizes in the pancreas of a patient with Mahvash disease

Mahvash disease is an autosomal recessive, hereditary pancreatic neuroendocrine tumor syndrome. The genetic defect that causes Mahvash disease is biallelic inactivating mutations of the glucagon receptor gene (GCGR). Mahvash disease was discovered by American physician Run Yu and his colleagues in 2008. Mahvash disease is rare. There have been over 20 cases of Mahvash disease described in detail by the end of 2025. Mahvash disease occurs in both females and males. Mahvash disease is also called "glucagon cell hyperplasia and neoplasia" or "glucagon cell adenomatosis" by some authors but Mahvash disease is a distinct disease entity while the two alternative terms are mostly histological descriptions. Some patients with "glucagon cell hyperplasia and neoplasia" do not have glucagon receptor mutations.

== Signs and symptoms ==
Most patients with Mahvash disease are diagnosed in adulthood. Patients with Mahvash disease usually present with vague abdominal discomfort. Imaging with CT or MRI identifies a very large pancreas with one or more tumors. Biochemical testing shows marked hyperglucagonemia (hundreds-fold elevated). If the tumors are resected, they are found to be neuroendocrine tumors that usually express glucagon. In the tumor margin, pancreatic alpha cell hyperplasia is pervasive, numerous large islets composed of mostly alpha cells are evident, and multiple microadenomas and small neuroendocrine tumors often are present. The pancreatic neuroendocrine tumors are the main health concern for patients with Mahvash disease. Although the tumors commonly are indolent, death due to liver metastasis has been reported. In patients with complete loss of glucagon receptor function, Mahvash disease can present at younger age with portal hypertension and hepatic encephalopathy.

== Pathogenesis ==
Mahvash disease is a form of reactive pancreatic alpha cell hyperplasia. The loss of normal glucagon signaling (particularly in the liver) due to inactive glucagon receptor results in enzymatic changes in the liver so that the liver releases abnormally large quantities of amino acids into the circulation. High concentration of amino acids in the circulation (hyperaminoacidemia) stimulates the pancreatic alpha cells (the cells that normally produce glucagon) to proliferate and to produce and release much more glucagon. The enormous proliferative activity of the pancreatic alpha cells predisposes them to tumor formation. All patients with Mahvash disease have hyperaminoacidemia, hyperglucagonemia (high concentration of glucagon in the circulation), and pancreatic alpha cell hyperplasia, and develop pancreatic neuroendocrine tumors in adulthood. The pathogenesis of portal hypertension and hepatic encephalopathy is not clear yet.

== Diagnosis ==
A large pancreas with marked hyperglucagonemia in an adult makes the diagnosis of Mahvash disease very likely. The existence of pancreatic tumors makes the diagnosis even more likely. Histologically, pancreatic alpha cell hyperplasia and microadenomas suggest the diagnosis of Mahvash disease. The final diagnosis of Mahvash disease requires mutational analysis of the glucagon receptor gene.

== Treatment ==
The treatment of Mahvash disease currently focuses on managing the pancreatic neuroendocrine tumors. Small tumors can be monitored but large ones need to be resected. As patients with Mahvash disease have life-long risk of developing pancreatic neuroendocrine tumors, they need to undergo periodic biochemical testing and imaging. Liver transplant is a safe and effective treatment for patients with portal hypertension and hepatic encephalopathy.
