= Pancreatic neuroendocrine tumor =

Tumors of the nervous or endocrine system within the pancreas

- Specialty: Oncology
- Treatment: Radiation, chemotherapy
- Prognosis: Five-year survival rate ~ 61%

Pancreatic neuroendocrine tumours (PanNETs, PETs, or PNETs), often referred to as "islet cell tumours", or "pancreatic endocrine tumours" are neuroendocrine neoplasms that arise from cells of the endocrine (hormonal) and nervous system within the pancreas.

PanNETs are a type of neuroendocrine tumor, representing about one-third of gastroenteropancreatic neuroendocrine tumors (GEP-NETs). Many PanNETs are benign, while some are malignant. Aggressive PanNET tumors have traditionally been termed "islet cell carcinoma".

PanNETs are quite distinct from the usual form of pancreatic cancer, the majority of which are adenocarcinomas, which arise in the exocrine pancreas. Only 1 or 2% of clinically significant pancreas neoplasms are PanNETs.

== Types ==
The majority of PanNETs are benign, while some are malignant. The World Health Organization (WHO) classification scheme places neuroendocrine tumors into three main categories, which emphasize the tumor grade rather than the anatomical origin. In practice, those tumors termed well or intermediately differentiated PanNETs in the WHO scheme are sometimes called "islet cell tumors". The high-grade subtype termed neuroendocrine cancer (NEC) in the WHO scheme, is synonymous with "islet cell carcinoma".

Types of PNET based on hormones produced
| Type | Relative incidence | Typical location of tumor | Biomarkers | Symptoms |
|---|---|---|---|---|
| Insulinoma | 35–40% | Head, body, tail of pancreas | insulin, proinsulin, C-peptide | Hypoglycemia |
| Gastrinoma | 16–30% | Gastrinoma triangle | gastrin, PP | Abdominal pain; Refractory peptic ulcer disease; Secretory diarrhea |
| VIPoma | <10% | Distal pancreas (body and tail) | VIP | Profuse watery diarrhea; Dehydration; Hypokalemia; Achlorhydria |
| Somatostatinoma | <5% | Pancreatoduodenal groove, ampullary, periampullary | somatostatin | Diabetes mellitus; Cholelithiasis; Steatorrhea; Anemia; Weight loss |
| PPoma | | Head of pancreas | pancreatic polypeptide | |
| Glucagonoma | 1% | Body and tail of pancreas | glucagon, glycentin | Necrolytic migratory erythema; Diabetes mellitus; Diarrhea; Deep vein thrombosis |

Relative incidence is given as percentage of all functional pancreatic neuroendocrine tumors.

== Signs and symptoms ==
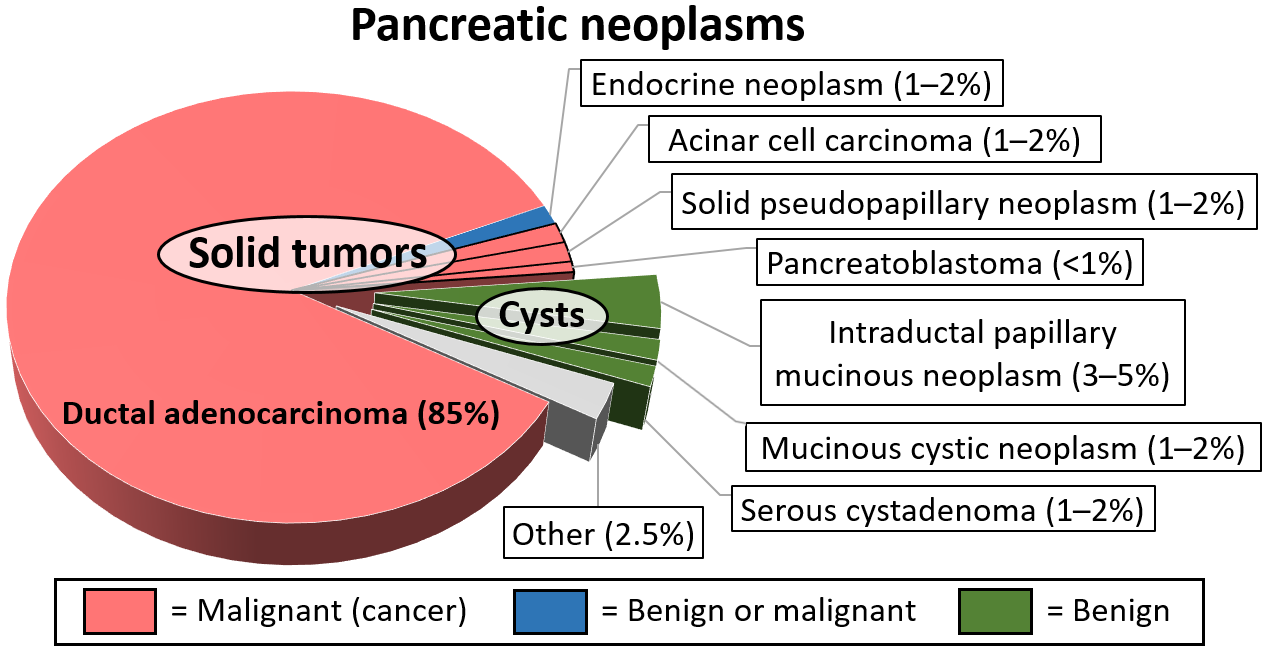
Relative incidences of various pancreatic neoplasms, with pancreatic endocrine neoplasms in blue

Some PanNETs do not cause any symptoms, in which case they may be discovered incidentally on a CT scan performed for a different purpose. Symptoms such as abdominal or back pain or pressure, diarrhea, indigestion, or yellowing of the skin and whites of the eyes can arise from the effects of a larger PanNET tumor, either locally or at a metastasis. About 40% of PanNETS have symptoms related to excessive secretion of hormones or active polypeptides and are accordingly labeled as "functional"; the symptoms reflect the type of hormone secreted, as discussed below. Up to 90% of PanNETs are nonsecretory or nonfunctional, in which there is no secretion, or the quantity or type of products, such as pancreatic polypeptide (PPoma), chromogranin A, and neurotensin, do not cause a clinical syndrome although blood levels may be elevated. In total, 85% of PanNETs have an elevated blood marker.

Functional tumors are often classified by the hormone most strongly secreted, for example:

- gastrinoma: the excessive gastrin causes Zollinger–Ellison syndrome (ZES) with peptic ulcers and diarrhea
- insulinoma: hypoglycemia occurs with concurrent elevations of insulin, proinsulin and C peptide
- glucagonoma: the symptoms are not all due to glucagon elevations, and include a rash, sore mouth, altered bowel habits, venous thrombosis, and high blood glucose levels
- VIPoma, producing excessive vasoactive intestinal peptide, which may cause profound chronic watery diarrhea and resultant dehydration, hypokalemia, and achlorhydria (WDHA or pancreatic cholera syndrome)
- somatostatinoma: these rare tumors are associated with elevated blood glucose levels, achlorhydria, cholelithiasis, and diarrhea
- less common types include ACTHoma, CRHoma, calcitoninoma, GHRHoma, GRFoma, and parathyroid hormone–related peptide tumor

In these various types of functional tumors, the frequency of malignancy and the survival prognosis have been estimated dissimilarly, but a pertinent accessible summary is available.

== Diagnosis ==
Because symptoms are non-specific, diagnosis is often delayed.

Measurement of hormones including pancreatic polypeptide, gastrin, proinsulin, insulin, glucagon, and vasoactive intestinal peptide can determine if a tumor is causing hypersecretion.

Multiphase CT and MRI are the primary modalities for morphologic imaging of PNETs. While MRI is superior to CT for imaging, both of the primary tumor and evaluation of metastases, CT is more readily available. Notably, while many malignant lesions are hypodense in contrast-enhanced studies, the liver metastases of PNETs are hypervascular and readily visualized in the late arterial phase of the post-contrast CT study. However, morphological imaging alone is not sufficient for a definite diagnosis

On biopsy, immunohistochemistry is generally positive for chromogranin and synaptophysin. Genetic testing thereof typically shows altered MEN1 and DAXX/ATRX.

== Staging, classification and grading ==
The new 2019 WHO classification and grading criteria for neuroendocrine tumors of the digestive system grades all the neuroendocrine tumors into three grades, based on their degree of cellular differentiation (from well-differentiated NET grade (G)1 to G3, and poorly-differentiated neuroendokrina cancer, NEC G3), morphology, mitotic rate and Ki-67 index. The NCCN recommends the use of the same AJCC-UICC staging system as pancreatic adenocarcinoma. Using this scheme, the stage by stage outcomes for PanNETs are dissimilar to pancreatic exocrine cancers. A different TNM system for PanNETs has been proposed by The European Neuroendocrine Tumor Society.

Pancreatic neuroendocrine tumor staging (AJCC)

Stage T1

Stage T2

Stage T3

Stage T4

Involvement of nearby lymph nodes – Stage N1

Metastasis – stage M1

== Treatment ==
In general, treatment for PanNET encompasses the same array of options as other neuroendocrine tumors, as discussed in that main article. However, there are some specific differences, which are discussed here.

In functioning PanNETs, octreotide is usually recommended prior to biopsy or surgery but is generally avoided in insulinomas to avoid profound hypoglycemia.

PanNETs in Multiple endocrine neoplasia type 1 are often multiple, and thus require different treatment and surveillance strategies.

Some PanNETs are more responsive to chemotherapy than are gastroenteric carcinoid tumors. Several agents have shown activity. In well differentiated PanNETs, chemotherapy is generally reserved for when there are no other treatment options. Combinations of several medicines have been used, such as doxorubicin with streptozocin and fluorouracil (5-FU) and capecitabine with temozolomide. Although marginally effective in well-differentiated PETs, cisplatin with etoposide has some activity in poorly differentiated neuroendocrine cancers (PDNECs), particularly if the PDNEC has an extremely high Ki-67 score of over 50%.

Several targeted therapy agents have been approved in PanNETs by the FDA based on improved progression-free survival (PFS):

- everolimus (Afinitor) is labeled for treatment of progressive neuroendocrine tumors of pancreatic origin in patients with unresectable, locally advanced or metastatic disease. The safety and effectiveness of everolimus in carcinoid tumors have not been established.
- sunitinib (Sutent) is labeled for treatment of progressive, well-differentiated pancreatic neuroendocrine tumors in patients with unresectable locally advanced or metastatic disease. Sutent also has approval from the European Commission for the treatment of 'unresectable or metastatic, well-differentiated pancreatic neuroendocrine tumors with disease progression in adults'. A phase III study of sunitinib treatment in well differentiated pNET that had worsened within the past 12 months (either advanced or metastatic disease) showed that sunitinib treatment improved progression-free survival (11.4 months vs. 5.5 months), overall survival, and the objective response rate (9.3% vs. 0.0%) when compared with placebo.

== Genetics ==
Pancreatic neuroendocrine tumors may arise in the context of multiple endocrine neoplasia type 1, Von Hippel–Lindau disease, neurofibromatosis type 1 (NF-1) or tuberose sclerosis (TSC)

Analysis of somatic DNA mutations in well-differentiated pancreatic neuroendocrine tumors identified four important findings:

- as expected, the genes mutated in NETs, MEN1, ATRX, DAXX, TSC2, PTEN and PIK3CA, are different from the mutated genes previously found in pancreatic adenocarcinoma.
- one in six well-differentiated pancreatic NETs have mutations in mTOR pathway genes, such as TSC2, PTEN and PIK3CA. The sequencing discovery might allow selection of which NETs would benefit from mTOR inhibition such as with everolimus, but this awaits validation in a clinical trial.
- mutations affecting a new cancer pathway involving ATRX and DAXX genes were found in about 40% of pancreatic NETs. The proteins encoded by ATRX and DAXX participate in chromatin remodeling of telomeres; these mutations are associated with a telomerase-independent maintenance mechanism termed ALT (alternative lengthening of telomeres) that results in abnormally long telomeric ends of chromosomes.
- ATRX/DAXX and MEN1 mutations were associated with a better prognosis.
