= Trophic hormone =

Class of hormones

Trophic hormones are hormones of the anterior lobe of the pituitary. These hormones affect growth, function, or nutrition of other endocrine cells. Trophic hormones can be found in body systems including the endocrine, gastrointestinal, urinary, and nervous systems. The term trophic is from Ancient Greek τροφικός (trophikós) meaning "pertaining to food or nourishment", here used to mean "growth"; this is the same origin as atrophy. This should not be confused with tropic, as in the similar-sounding tropic hormone – the words and concepts are both unrelated.

An example of this is thyroid-stimulating hormone stimulating the thyroid; excess thyroid-stimulating hormone can create a goitre.

Trophic hormones from the anterior pituitary include:

- Thyroid-stimulating hormone (TSH or thyrotropin) – stimulates the thyroid gland increasing the size and number of cells.
- Adrenocorticotropic hormone (ACTH or corticotropin) – stimulates the adrenal cortex increasing the size and number of cells.
- Luteinizing hormone (LH)/ Follicle-stimulating hormone (FSH) - regulate reproductive function in both males and females.
- Gastrin - stimulates mucosal growth in the stomach after food consumption in vertebrates.

== Gastrointestinal ==
The gastrointestinal tract has multiple trophic factors that regulate growth. The gut contains peptides that stimulate mucosal growth of stomach, colon, and small bowl cells. The hormones secreted control other gastrointestinal functions like regulation of secretion, motility, digestion and absorption.

== See also ==
- Endocrine system
- Tropic hormone
- Non-tropic hormone
