= Non-tropic hormone =

Non-tropic hormones are hormones that directly stimulate target cells to induce effects. This differs from the tropic hormones, which act on another endocrine gland. Non-tropic hormones are those that act directly on targeted tissues or cells, and not on other endocrine gland to stimulate release of other hormones. Many hormones act in a chain reaction. Tropic hormones usually act in the beginning of the reaction stimulating other endocrine gland to eventually release non-tropic hormones. These are the ones that act in the end of the chain reaction on other cells that are not part of other endocrine gland. The hypothalamic-pituitary-adrenal axis is a perfect example of this chain reaction. The reaction begins in the hypothalamus with a release of corticotropin-releasing hormone/factor (CRH/F; tropic). This stimulates the anterior pituitary and causes it to release adrenocorticotropic hormone (ACTH; tropic) to the adrenal glands. Lastly, cortisol (non-tropic) is secreted from the adrenal glands and goes into the bloodstream where it can have more widespread effects on organs and tissues. Since cortisol is what finally reaches other tissues in the body, it is a non-tropic hormone. CRH and ACTH are tropic hormones because they act on the anterior pituitary gland and adrenal glands, respectively, both of which are endocrine glands. Non-tropic hormones are thus often the last piece of a larger process and chain of hormone secretion. Both tropic and non-tropic hormones are necessary for proper endocrine function. For example, if ACTH (Adrenocorticotropin hormone; a tropic hormone) is inhibited, cortisol can no longer be released because the chain reaction has been interrupted. Some examples of non-tropic hormones are:

- Glucocorticoids: secreted from the adrenal glands and released directly into the blood stream where it alters blood glucose levels. Glucocorticoids, including hormones such as cortisol and corticosterone, are highly involved in the stress response, and are often referred to as the stress hormones. In the case of chronic stress, glucocorticoids can be very damaging to memory.
- Vasopressin (Antidiuretic hormone; ADH): secreted from the posterior pituitary and acts on the kidneys to maintain water balance in the body.
- Estrogen: secreted from the ovaries and aid in fetal development as well as development of secondary sexual characteristics in females.
- Testosterone: secreted from the testes, testosterone influences not only gonadal development, but aggressive behavior, sexual behavior, and masculinization of males.
- Oxytocin: secreted from the posterior pituitary and acts on the uterus and mammary glands to produce contractions. It is also involved in pair bonding and sexual selection and behaviors.
- Epinephrine and Norepinephrine: secreted from the adrenal medulla and acts on the heart, liver, and blood vessels primarily in acute stress situations. They are key components of the processes involved in the sympathetic nervous system. Since they are involved in arousal, stress, and often physical exercise some of these hormones are also called stress hormones.

Most endocrine glands, such as the gonads, pancreas, and adrenal glands, produce non-tropic hormones. Those released from the pituitary gland in the brain include vasopressin and oxytocin.

== See also ==
- Endocrine system
- Tropic hormone

== Sources ==
- Biology 12 McGraw Hill Ryerson (Textbook)
- An Introduction to Behavioral Endocrinology (Textbook)
