= ATR-X syndrome =

Alpha-thalassemia mental retardation syndrome
- Other names: ATR-X syndrome
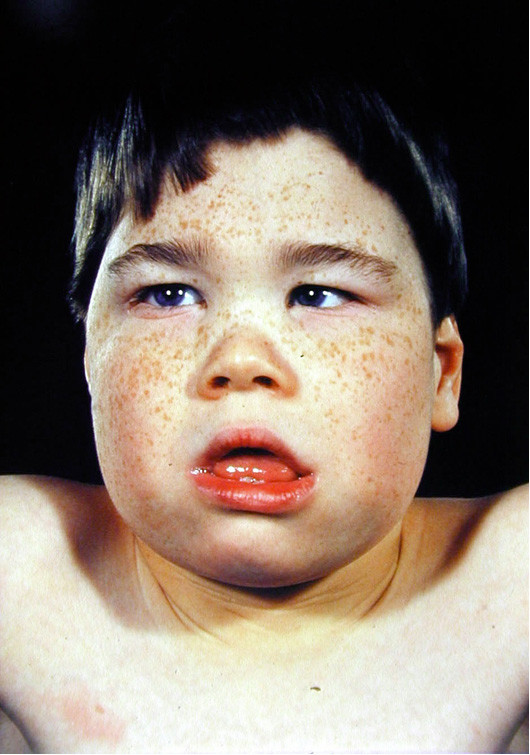
- Child of 8 yrs with the characteristic facial features of ATR-X syndrome. Note the upswept frontal hair line, hypertelorism, epicanthic folds, flat nasal bridge, small triangular upturned nose, tented upper lip, everted lower lip and hypotonic facies.

Alpha-thalassemia mental retardation syndrome (ATRX), also called alpha-thalassemia X-linked intellectual disability syndrome, nondeletion type or ATR-X syndrome, is an X-linked recessive condition associated with a mutation in the ATRX gene. Males with this condition tend to be moderately intellectually disabled and have physical characteristics including coarse facial features, microcephaly (small head size), hypertelorism (widely spaced eyes), a depressed nasal bridge, a tented upper lip and an everted lower lip. Mild or moderate anemia, associated with alpha-thalassemia, is part of the condition. Females with this mutated gene have no specific signs or features, but if they do, they may demonstrate skewed X chromosome inactivation.

== Epigenetics ==
"The role of ATRX as a regulator of heterochromatin dynamics raises the possibility that mutations in ATRX may lead to downstream transcriptional effects across the complex of genes or repetitive regions involved in the global context of the disorder, in addition to explaining phenotypical differences in these patients. For example, ATRX mutations affect the expression of alpha-globin gene cluster, causing alpha-thalassemia." ATRX interacts with the transcription co-factor DAXX and the alpha-globin gene cluster. Together they are all responsible for depositing the histone H3.3 at telomeric and pericentromeric regions. They are also responsible for regulating gene expression at these regions. ATRX is characterized by hypo- and hypermethylated regions. It's important to recognize that having a mutation in the ATRX gene does not necessarily guarantee that the patient has ATR-X syndrome. However, it is common within ATR-X patients to have global hypermethylation of usually unmethylated regions, like CpG islands and promoters. Several of the genes that undergo methylation changes are responsible for biosynthetic, metabolic, and methylation processes, and 42.5% of these genes are present in the telomeric and pericentromeric regions. A couple of these genes include: PRDM9 and 2-BHMT2. PRDM9 encodes for a histone H3 lysine-4 trimethyltransferase, which is a known target for ATRX, and 2-BHMT2 encodes for betaine-homocysteine methyltransferase, which catalyzes the methylation of homocysteine.

ATR association can be separated into two groups. ATR-16 syndrome patients have a 1-2Mb deletion on the top of the chromosome 16 p-arm and are associated with a Mendelian inheritance of a-thalassemia. ATR-X syndrome patients have no deletion in chromosome 16, a-thalassemia is rare, and this syndrome is consistent with X-linked recessive inheritance. However, both groups have similar phenotypes. The phenotypes resulting from ATR-X are due to skewed x-inactivation. When X-inactivation occurs randomly, half of the cells in the carrier female would contain the abnormality. When X-inactivation is skewed, more than 50% of one X chromosome are becoming inactive, and if that X-chromosome is passed to a male, they will have a higher percent of heterochromatin. The ATR-X locus spans the control center Xist, which regulates X-inactivation. When there is a XH2 mutation in the ATR-X locus, this indicates Xist to inactivate the chromosome increasing the amount of heterochromatin in males.

Epigenetics is also present among transcriptional regulators. ATR-X is caused by XH2 mutations in the region Xq13.3, and XH2 belongs to the subgroup SNF2. This group is important for regulating the transcription of the alpha genes.

== Diagnosis ==
If ATR-X is suspected based on symptoms, diagnosis can be established via karyotyping (to rule out similar illnesses associated with chromosomal aberrations, with the expected karyotype 46,XY) and molecular genetic testing. The affected individual might have a de novo mutation in the ATRX gene or have inherited the pathogenic variant of ATRX from their mother. Female members of the same family will often be asked to partake in genome testing because of their potential heterozygous carrier status.
