= Endocrine gland =

Glands of the endocrine system that secrete hormones to blood

Endocrine glands
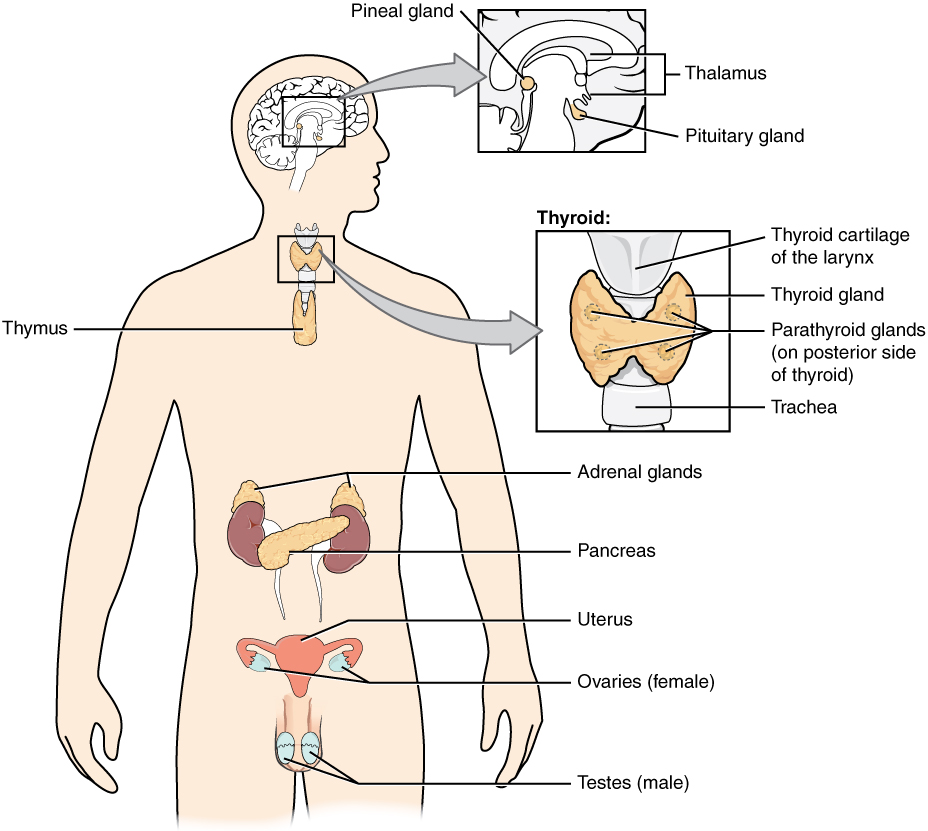
- The major endocrine glands: Pineal gland; Pituitary gland; Thyroid gland; Thymus; Adrenal gland; Pancreas; Ovary; Testicle

Details
- System: Endocrine system

Identifiers
- Latin: glandulae endocrine
- MeSH: D004702
- TA98: A11.0.00.000
- TA2: 3852
- TH: H2.00.02.0.03072
- FMA: 9602

The endocrine system is a network of glands and organs located throughout the body. Along with the nervous system, it makes the neuroendocrine system, which controls and regulates many of the body's functions. Endocrine glands are ductless glands of the endocrine system that secrete their products, hormones, directly into the blood. The major glands of the endocrine system include the pineal gland, pituitary gland, pancreas, ovaries, testicles, thyroid gland, parathyroid gland, hypothalamus and adrenal glands. The hypothalamus and pituitary glands are neuroendocrine organs.

Endocrine glands in the human head and neck and their hormones

== Pituitary gland ==
The pituitary gland hangs from the base of the brain by the pituitary stalk, and is enclosed by bone. It consists of a hormone-producing glandular portion of the anterior pituitary and a neural portion of the posterior pituitary, which is an extension of the hypothalamus. The hypothalamus regulates the hormonal output of the anterior pituitary and creates two hormones that it exports to the posterior pituitary for storage and later release.

Four of the six anterior pituitary hormones are tropic hormones that regulate the function of other endocrine organs. Most anterior pituitary hormones exhibit a diurnal rhythm of release, which is subject to modification by stimuli influencing the hypothalamus.

Somatotropic hormone or growth hormone (GH) is an anabolic hormone that stimulates the growth of all body tissues especially skeletal muscle and bone. It may act directly, or indirectly via insulin-like growth factors (IGFs). GH mobilizes fats, stimulates protein synthesis, and inhibits glucose uptake and metabolism. Secretion is regulated by growth hormone-releasing hormone (GHRH) and growth hormone-inhibiting hormone (GHIH), or somatostatin. Hypersecretion causes gigantism in children and acromegaly in adults; hyposecretion in children causes pituitary dwarfism.

Thyroid-stimulating hormone promotes normal development and activity of the thyroid gland. Thyrotropin-releasing hormone stimulates its release; negative feedback of thyroid hormone inhibits it.

Adrenocorticotropic hormone stimulates the adrenal cortex to release corticosteroids. Adrenocorticotropic hormone release is triggered by corticotropin-releasing hormone and inhibited by rising glucocorticoid levels.

The gonadotropins—follicle-stimulating hormone and luteinizing hormone regulate the functions of the gonads in both sexes. Follicle-stimulating hormone stimulates sex cell production; luteinizing hormone stimulates gonadal hormone production. Gonadotropin levels rise in response to gonadotropin-releasing hormone. Negative feedback of gonadal hormones inhibits gonadotropin release.

Prolactin promotes milk production in human females. Its secretion is prompted by prolactin-releasing hormone and inhibited by prolactin-inhibiting hormone.

The intermediate lobe of the pituitary gland secretes only one enzyme that is melanocyte stimulating hormone. It is linked with the formation of the black pigment in our skin called melanin.

The neurohypophysis stores and releases two hypothalamic hormones:

- Oxytocin stimulates powerful uterine contractions, which trigger labour and delivery of an infant, and milk ejection in nursing women. Its release is mediated reflexively by the hypothalamus and represents a positive feedback mechanism.
- Antidiuretic hormone stimulates the kidney tubules to reabsorb and conserve water, resulting in small volumes of highly concentrated urine and decreased plasma osmolality. Antidiuretic hormone is released in response to high solute concentrations in the blood and inhibited by low solute concentrations in the blood. Hyposecretion results in diabetes insipidus.

== Thyroid gland ==
The thyroid gland is located in the front of the neck, in front of the thyroid cartilage, and is shaped like a butterfly, with two wings connected by a central isthmus. Thyroid tissue consists of follicles with a stored protein called colloid, containing thyroglobulin, a precursor to other thyroid hormones, which are manufactured within the colloid.

The thyroid hormones increase the rate of cellular metabolism, and include thyroxine (T4) and triiodothyronine (T3). Secretion is stimulated by the thyroid-stimulating hormone, secreted by the anterior pituitary. When thyroid levels are high, there is negative feedback that decreases the amount of Thyroid-stimulating hormone secreted. Most T4 is converted to T3 (a more active form) in the target tissues.

Calcitonin, produced by the parafollicular cells (C cells) of the thyroid gland in response to rising blood calcium levels, depresses blood calcium levels by inhibiting bone matrix resorption and enhancing calcium deposit in bones. Excessive secretion cause hyperthyroidism and deficiency cause hypothyroidism.

== Parathyroid glands ==
The parathyroid glands, of which there are 4–6, are found on the back of the thyroid glands, and secrete parathyroid hormone. This causes an increase in blood calcium levels by targeting bone, the intestine, and the kidneys. The parathyroid hormone is the antagonist of calcitonin. Parathyroid hormone release is triggered by falling blood calcium levels and is inhibited by rising blood calcium levels.

== Adrenal glands ==
The adrenal glands are located above the kidneys in humans and in front of the kidneys in other animals. The adrenal glands produce a variety of hormones including adrenaline and the steroids aldosterone cortisol and Dehydroepiandrosterone sulfate (DHEA). Adrenaline increases blood pressure, heart rate, and metabolism in reaction to stress, the aldosterone controls the body's salt and water balance, the cortisol plays a role in stress response and the dehydroepiandrosterone sulfate (DHEA) produces aids in production of body odor and growth of body hair during puberty.

== Pancreas ==
The pancreas, located in the abdomen, below and behind the stomach, is both an exocrine and an endocrine gland. The alpha and beta cells are the endocrine cells in the pancreatic islets that release insulin and glucagon and smaller amounts of other hormones into the blood. Insulin and glucagon influence blood sugar levels. Glucagon is released when the blood glucose level is low and stimulates the liver to release glucose into the blood. Insulin increases the rate of glucose uptake and metabolism by most body cells.

Somatostatin is released by delta cells and acts as an inhibitor of GH, insulin, and glucagon.

== Gonads ==
The ovaries of the female, located in the pelvic cavity, release two main hormones. Secretion of estrogens by the ovarian follicles begins at puberty under the influence of follicle-stimulating hormone. Estrogens stimulate the maturation of the female reproductive system and the development of secondary sexual characteristics. Progesterone is released in response to high blood levels of luteinizing hormone. It works with estrogens in establishing the menstrual cycle.

The testes of the male begin to produce testosterone at puberty in response to luteinizing hormone. Testosterone promotes maturation of the male reproductive organs, development of secondary sex characteristics such as increased muscle and bone mass, and the growth of body hair.

== Pineal gland ==
The pineal gland is located in the diencephalon of the brain. It primarily releases melatonin, which influences daily rhythms and may have an antigonadotropic effect in humans. It may also influence the melanotropes and melanocytes located in the skin.

== Other hormone-producing structures ==
Many body organs not normally considered endocrine organs contain isolated cell clusters that secrete hormones. Examples include the heart (atrial natriuretic peptide); gastrointestinal tract organs (gastrin, secretin, and others); the placenta (hormones of pregnancy—estrogen, progesterone, and others); the kidneys (erythropoietin and renin); the thymus; skin (cholecalciferol); and adipose tissue (leptin and resistin).

== Development ==
Endocrine glands derive from all three germ layers.

The natural decrease in function of the female's ovaries during late middle age results in menopause. The efficiency of all endocrine glands seems to decrease gradually as ageing occurs. This leads to a generalized increase in the incidence of diabetes mellitus and a lower metabolic rate.

== Functions ==
=== Hormones ===
Local chemical messengers, not generally considered part of the endocrine system, include autocrines, which act on the cells that secrete them, and paracrines, which act on a different cell type nearby.

The ability of a target cell to respond to a hormone depends on the presence of receptors, within the cell or on its plasma membrane, to which the hormone can bind.

Hormone receptors are dynamic structures. Changes in the number and sensitivity of hormone receptors may occur in response to high or low levels of stimulating hormones.

Blood levels of hormones reflect a balance between secretion and degradation/excretion. The liver and kidneys are the major organs that degrade hormones; breakdown products are excreted in urine and faeces.

Hormone half-life and duration of activity are limited and vary from hormone to hormone.

Interaction of hormones at target cells Permissiveness is the situation in which a hormone cannot exert its full effects without the presence of another hormone.

Synergism occurs when two or more hormones produce the same effects in a target cell and their results are amplified.

Antagonism occurs when a hormone opposes or reverses the effect of another hormone.

=== Control ===
The endocrine glands belong to the body's control system. The hormones which they produce help to regulate the functions of cells and tissues throughout the body. Endocrine organs are activated to release their hormones by humoral, neural, or hormonal stimuli. Negative feedback is important in regulating hormone levels in the blood.

The nervous system, acting through hypothalamic controls, can in certain cases override or modulate hormonal effects.

== Clinical significance ==
=== Disease ===
Disability-adjusted life year for endocrine disorders per 100,000 inhabitants in 2002. no data less than 80 80–160 160–240 240–320 320–400 400–480 480–560 560–640 640–720 720–800 800–1000 more than 1000

Diseases of the endocrine glands are common, including conditions such as diabetes mellitus, thyroid disease, and obesity.

Endocrine disease is characterized by irregulated hormone release (a productive pituitary adenoma), inappropriate response to signalling (hypothyroidism), lack of a gland (diabetes mellitus type 1, diminished erythropoiesis in chronic kidney failure), or structural enlargement in a critical site such as the thyroid (toxic multinodular goitre). Hypofunction of endocrine glands can occur as a result of the loss of reserve, hyposecretion, agenesis, atrophy, or active destruction. Hyperfunction can occur as a result of hypersecretion, loss of suppression, hyperplastic, or neoplastic change, or hyperstimulation.

Endocrinopathies are classified as primary, secondary, or tertiary. Primary endocrine disease inhibits the action of downstream glands. Secondary endocrine disease is indicative of a problem with the pituitary gland. Tertiary endocrine disease is associated with dysfunction of the hypothalamus and its releasing hormones.

As the thyroid, and hormones have been implicated in signaling distant tissues to proliferate, for example, the estrogen receptor has been shown to be involved in certain breast cancers. Endocrine, paracrine, and autocrine signaling have all been implicated in proliferation, one of the required steps of oncogenesis.

Other common diseases that result from endocrine dysfunction include Addison's disease, Cushing's disease and Grave's disease. Cushing's disease and Addison's disease are pathologies involving the dysfunction of the adrenal gland. Dysfunction in the adrenal gland could be due to primary or secondary factors and can result in hypercortisolism or hypocortisolism. Cushing's disease is characterized by the hypersecretion of the adrenocorticotropic hormone due to a pituitary adenoma that ultimately causes endogenous hypercortisolism by stimulating the adrenal glands. Some clinical signs of Cushing's disease include obesity, moon face, and hirsutism. Addison's disease is an endocrine disease that results from hypocortisolism caused by adrenal gland insufficiency. Adrenal insufficiency is significant because it is correlated with decreased ability to maintain blood pressure and blood sugar, a defect that can prove to be fatal.

Graves' disease involves the hyperactivity of the thyroid gland which produces the T3 and T4 hormones. Graves' disease effects range from excess sweating, fatigue, heat intolerance and high blood pressure to swelling of the eyes that causes redness, puffiness and in rare cases reduced or double vision.

Graves' disease is the most common cause of hyperthyroidism; hyposecretion causes cretinism in infants and myxoedema in adults.

Hyperparathyroidism results in hypercalcemia and its effects and in extreme bone wasting. Hypoparathyroidism leads to hypocalcemia, evidenced by tetany seizure and respiratory paralysis. Hyposecretion of insulin results in diabetes mellitus; cardinal signs are polyuria, polydipsia, and polyphagia.
