= Brockmann body =

Endocrine organ in some teleost fish

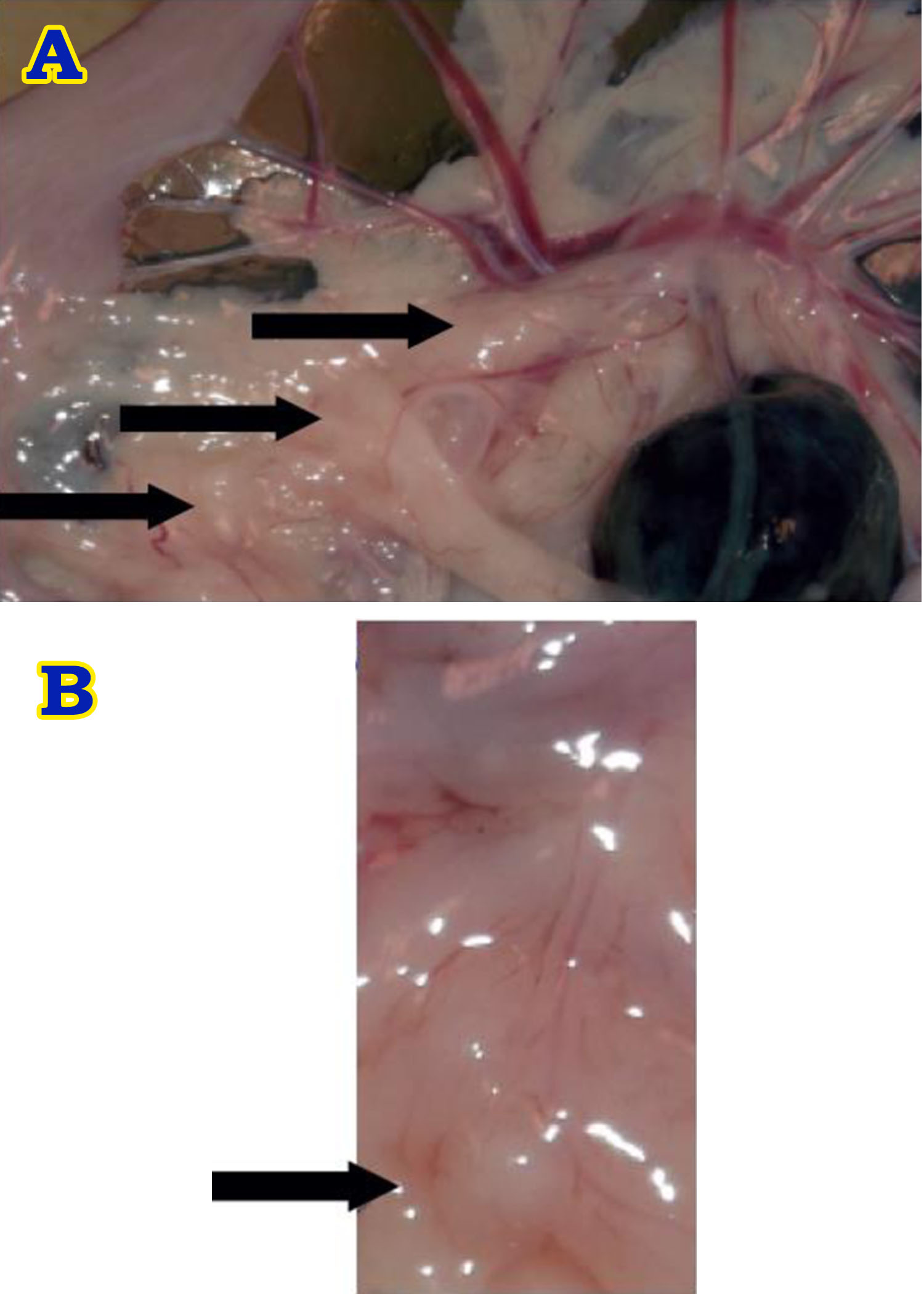
Brockmann bodies isolated from an Atlantic wolffish. (A) Pancreatic tissues are scattered in the mesentery (black arrows). (B) The Brockmann body is indicated with an arrow.

Brockmann body is an endocrine organ in some teleost fish, and is composed of a collection of islet tissues. The islet tissues are in turn composed of endocrine cells which are the principal sites of insulin synthesis. They are distributed around the spleen and the large intestine. They also secrete other hormones such as glucagon and somatostatin. Hence, Brochmann body is the centre of control of blood glucose level in these fishes. Glucagon is also produced from the intestine, but Brockmann body is the major source. Increased level of glucose stimulate the Brockmann body to release insulin, while inhibiting glucagon. Somatostatin released from Brockmann body inhibits cells to produce insulin and glucagon. In addition it inhibits release of growth hormone from the pituitary. It is named after a German physician Heinrich Brochmann who discovered it in 1848.

Brochmann body has gained a new attention in medical research, specifically in the management of type I diabetes mellitus. This is because the tissue is easy to harvest, and its insulin can be easily extracted. In addition, the teleost fishes can regenerate their endocrine tissues after harvest, the property of which has challenging implication in human diabetes.

== Structure ==
A typical Brochmann body is mass of whitish nodules of variable sizes, ranging from 1 to 8 mm in diameter. The nodules are composed of polygonal and elongated cells. The cells are enveloped with connective tissues. They are separated into two major islets: one is found near the spleen and the other is located inside the wall of the duodenum, at the pyloric junction. Both islet groups contain insulin, glucagon, peptide YY and somatostatin, but these proteins are secreted only in the pyloric Brockmann bodies. The amino acid sequence and primary structure of the hormones are slightly different from their counterparts in higher vertebrates. For example, tilapia and human insulin differs by 17 amino acids. There are also amino acid variation among different species; for example, glutamine residue, at position 5 in the A-chain of insulin in most teleosts, is replaced by glutamic acid in tilapia.

== Medical significance ==
Brochmann body shows medical benefits in the management of endocrine and immunological disorders. An advantage of using teleost fish over other animals, such as pigs, in the studies of diabetes mellitus is that its endocrine cells are separated from the pancreatic exocrine tissue and can be easily isolated and harvested, while mammalian pancreas is expensive and laborious to collect. Further, fish tissue can be preserved in better condition for longer period. Moreover, the teleost fishes can regenerate their endocrine tissues after harvest, implying that the property could be beneficial in type I diabetes mellitus.

The Brockmann body of the tilapia (Oreochromis nilotica) is investigated as a potential xenograft tissue for patients with type 1 diabetes. The transplantation of tilapia Brockmann bodies into a diabetic mice model has been shown to promote long-term normal blood glucose level. The tilapia islet grafts give better blood glucose level than rat or mouse islet grafts. But as in mammalian transplant, tissue rejection is a problem. An attempt to solve this is creation of a transgenic tilapia that contain a human insulin gene. These transgenic tilapia produce stable amount of human insulin, and are now undergoing selective breeding.
