= Volagidemab =

Monoclonal antibody

Monoclonal antibody
- Type: ?

Clinical data
- Other names: REMD-477; AMG-477
- ATC code: None

Identifiers
- CAS Number: 1233956-13-2
- DrugBank: DB16421
- UNII: 77JYS6UZ0M

Volagidemab (development name REMD-477) is a monoclonal antibody that targets the glucagon receptor. It is developed by REMD Biotherapeutics for type 1 and type 2 diabetes. A phase II trial did not meet its primary endpoint.

== Research ==
A systematic review and meta-analysis of volagidemab, published in 2024, found it to be potentially beneficial in the treatment of type 1 diabetes.
