= Tropic hormone =

Class of hormones

Tropic hormones are hormones that have other endocrine glands as their target. Most tropic hormones are produced and secreted by the anterior pituitary. The hypothalamus secretes tropic hormones that target the anterior pituitary, and the thyroid gland secretes thyroxine, which targets the hypothalamus and therefore can be considered a tropic hormone.

The term tropic is from Ancient Greek τροπικός (tropikós), in the sense "of or pertaining to a turn or change", meaning "causing a change, affecting"; this is the same origin as trope. This should not be confused with trophic, as in similar-sounding trophic hormone – the words and concepts are both unrelated. Tropic hormones are contrasted with non-tropic hormones, which directly stimulate target cells.

== Examples ==
=== Anterior pituitary ===
Tropic hormones from the anterior pituitary include:

- Thyroid-stimulating hormone (TSH or thyrotropin) – stimulates the thyroid gland to make and release thyroid hormone.
- Adrenocorticotropic hormone (ACTH or corticotropin) – stimulates the adrenal cortex to release glucocorticoids.
- Luteinizing hormone (LH) – stimulates the release of steroid hormones in gonads—the ovary and testes.
- Follicle-stimulating hormone (FSH) – stimulates the maturation of eggs and production of sperm.

=== Hypothalamus ===
In turn, the hypothalamus controls the release of hormones from the anterior pituitary by secreting a class of hypothalamic neurohormones called releasing and release-inhibiting hormones—which are released to the hypothalamo-hypophyseal portal system and act on the anterior pituitary.

== See also ==
- Endocrine system
- Non-tropic hormone
- Trophic hormone
