= ATRX =

Protein-coding gene in humans

Identifiers
- Aliases: ATRX, ATR2, JMS, MRXHF1, RAD54, RAD54L, SFM1, SHS, XH2, XNP, ZNF-HX, MRX52, alpha thalassemia/mental retardation syndrome X-linked, chromatin remodeler, ATRX chromatin remodeler
- External IDs: OMIM: 300032; MGI: 103067; GeneCards: ATRX
Available structures
PDB	Ortholog search: PDBe RCSB
PDB	List of PDB id codes 2JM1, 2LBM, 2LD1, 3QL9, 3QLA, 3QLC, 3QLN, 4W5A

Gene location (Human)
Chr.	X chromosome (human)
Band	Xq21.1	Start	77,504,880 bp
Band	Xq21.1	End	77,786,233 bp

Gene location (Mouse)
Chr.	X chromosome (mouse)
Band	X D|X 47.26 cM	Start	104,841,221 bp
Band	X D|X 47.26 cM	End	104,973,009 bp
RNA expression pattern
Bgee	Human / Mouse (ortholog); Top expressed in: endothelial cell; Achilles tendon; epithelium of colon; cerebellar vermis; Brodmann area 23; Epithelium of choroid plexus; pylorus; tibia; sural nerve; Region I of hippocampus proper / Top expressed in: genital tubercle; tail of embryo; pineal gland; medullary collecting duct; vestibular sensory epithelium; condyle; fossa; lobe of cerebellum; Gonadal ridge; ciliary body; More reference expression data
BioGPS	n/a
Gene ontology
Molecular function	DNA binding; nucleotide binding; chromo shadow domain binding; helicase activity; histone binding; metal ion binding; DNA translocase activity; methylated histone binding; DNA helicase activity; protein binding; hydrolase activity; ATP binding; chromatin binding; DNA-binding transcription factor activity, RNA polymerase II-specific
Cellular component	PML body; SWI/SNF superfamily-type complex; pericentric heterochromatin; chromosome; heterochromatin; nuclear chromosome; telomere; nucleus; nucleoplasm; nuclear body
Biological process	chromatin remodeling; nucleosome assembly; DNA recombination; post-embryonic forelimb morphogenesis; regulation of transcription, DNA-templated; multicellular organism growth; DNA damage response, signal transduction by p53 class mediator; positive regulation of nuclear cell cycle DNA replication; Sertoli cell development; transcription, DNA-templated; protein localization to chromosome, telomeric region; cellular response to DNA damage stimulus; positive regulation of telomeric RNA transcription from RNA pol II promoter; positive regulation of telomere maintenance; DNA methylation; negative regulation of telomeric RNA transcription from RNA pol II promoter; seminiferous tubule development; spermatogenesis; replication fork processing; negative regulation of maintenance of mitotic sister chromatid cohesion, telomeric; forebrain development; DNA repair; cellular response to hydroxyurea; positive regulation of transcription by RNA polymerase II; DNA duplex unwinding; regulation of histone H3-K9 trimethylation; meiotic spindle organization; chromosome organization involved in meiotic cell cycle; chromatin organization
Sources:Amigo / QuickGO
Orthologs
Databases	NCBI: entry; OMA: entry
Species	Human	Mouse
Entrez	546	22589
Ensembl	ENSG00000085224	ENSMUSG00000031229
UniProt	P46100	Q61687
RefSeq (mRNA)	NM_000489; NM_138270; NM_138271	NM_009530
RefSeq (protein)	NP_000480; NP_612114	NP_033556
Location (UCSC)	Chr X: 77.5 – 77.79 Mb	Chr X: 104.84 – 104.97 Mb
PubMed search
- Wikidata
View/Edit Human	View/Edit Mouse

Transcriptional regulator ATRX also known as ATP-dependent helicase ATRX, X-linked helicase II, or X-linked nuclear protein (XNP) is a protein that in humans is encoded by the ATRX gene.

== Function ==
Transcriptional regulator ATRX contains an ATPase / helicase domain, and thus it belongs to the SWI/SNF family of chromatin remodeling proteins. ATRX is required for deposition of the histone variant H3.3 at telomeres and other genomic repeats. These interactions are important for maintaining silencing at these sites.

In addition, ATRX undergoes cell cycle-dependent phosphorylation, which regulates its nuclear matrix and chromatin association, and suggests its involvement in the gene regulation at interphase and chromosomal segregation in mitosis.

== Clinical significance ==
=== Inherited mutations ===
Inherited mutations of the ATRX gene are associated with an X-linked intellectual disability (XLMR) syndrome most often accompanied by alpha-thalassemia (ATR-X) syndrome. These mutations have been shown to cause diverse changes in the pattern of DNA methylation, which may provide a link between chromatin remodeling, DNA methylation, and gene expression in developmental processes. Multiple alternatively spliced transcript variants encoding distinct isoforms have been reported. Female carriers may demonstrate skewed X chromosome inactivation.

=== Somatic mutations ===
Acquired mutations in ATRX have been reported in a number of human cancers including pancreatic neuroendocrine tumours, gliomas, osteosarcomas, soft-tissue sarcomas, and malignant pheochromocytomas. There is a strong correlation between ATRX mutations and an Alternative Lengthening of Telomeres (ALT) phenotype in cancers.

== Interactions ==
ATRX forms a complex with DAXX which is a histone H3.3 chaperone.

ATRX has been also shown to interact with EZH2.

== See also ==
- Alpha-thalassemia mental retardation syndrome
