= Glucagonoma =

Pancreatic tumor resulting in overproduction of glucagon

- Specialty: Oncology

Glucagonoma is a very rare tumor of the alpha cells of the pancreas that results in the overproduction of the hormone glucagon. Typically associated with a rash called necrolytic migratory erythema, weight loss, and mild diabetes mellitus, most people with glucagonoma contract it spontaneously. However, about 10% of cases are associated with multiple endocrine neoplasia type 1 (MEN-1) syndrome.

== Causes ==
Although the cause of glucagonoma is unknown, some genetic factors may lead to the condition. A family history of multiple endocrine neoplasia type 1 (MEN1) is a risk factor. Additionally, those with Mahvash disease have an increased risk for glucagonoma, as the glucagon receptor gene (GCGR) is mutated.

== Mechanism ==
Glucagonoma results from the overproduction of glucagon, a peptide hormone located in the pancreatic alpha cells. Classic symptoms include, but are not limited to, necrolytic migratory erythema (NME), diabetes mellitus, and weight loss. NME presents in about 70% of cases of glucagonoma, and is characterized by erythematous lesions over the distal extremities and the groin area. NME has occasionally been observed in people who do not have glucagonoma. People who develop glucagonoma from Mahvash disease also do not develop NME, implying that working glucagon receptors are needed in order for NME to be present in a person. Weight loss, the most commonly associated effect with glucagonoma, results from the glucagon hormone, which prevents the uptake of glucose by somatic cells. Diabetes is not present in all cases of glucagonoma, but does frequently result from the insulin and glucagon imbalance.

== Diagnosis ==
The presence of glucagonoma syndrome, the symptoms that accompany the pancreatic tumor, as well as elevated levels of glucagon in the blood, are what is used to diagnose glucagonoma. When a person presents with a blood glucagon concentration greater than 500 mg/mL along with the glucagonoma syndrome, a diagnosis can be established. Not all cases of hyperglucagonemia will lead to a diagnosis of glucagonoma. Elevated blood levels of glucagon are associated with other disorders like pancreatitis and kidney failure.

About 60% of people diagnosed with glucagonoma are women. Most of those that are diagnosed are between 45–60 years of age.

== Treatment ==
People who are diagnosed with sporadic glucagonoma often have an increased mortality rate compared to those with MEN1, as the latter group will go to the doctor for periodic visits. People whose tumor have metastasized cannot easily be treated as the tumor is resistant to chemotherapy. The only curative therapy for glucagonoma is surgery, and even this is not always successful.

Heightened glucagon secretion can be treated with the administration of octreotide, a somatostatin analog, which inhibits the release of glucagon. Doxorubicin and streptozotocin have also been used successfully to selectively damage alpha cells of the pancreatic islets. These do not destroy the tumor, but help to minimize progression of symptoms.

== History ==
Fewer than 251 cases of glucagonoma have been described in the literature since their first description by Becker in 1942. Because of its rarity (fewer than one in 20 million worldwide), long-term survival rates remain unknown. Glucagonoma accounts for approximately 1% of neuroendocrine tumors, although this may be an underestimate given that glucagonoma is associated with non-specific symptoms.
