= Glucagon receptor =

Protein-coding gene in the species Homo sapiens

GCGR

Identifiers
- Aliases: GCGR, GGR, GL-R, glucagon receptor, MVAH
- External IDs: OMIM: 138033; MGI: 99572; GeneCards: GCGR
Available structures
PDB	Ortholog search: PDBe RCSB
PDB	List of PDB id codes 3CZF, 4ERS, 4L6R, 2A83, 4LF3, 5EE7

Gene location (Human)
Chr.	Chromosome 17 (human)
Band	17q25.3	Start	81,804,132 bp
Band	17q25.3	End	81,814,008 bp

Gene location (Mouse)
Chr.	Chromosome 11 (mouse)
Band	11|11 E2	Start	120,421,525 bp
Band	11|11 E2	End	120,429,812 bp
RNA expression pattern
Bgee	Human / Mouse (ortholog); Top expressed in: right lobe of liver; tibial nerve; sural nerve; human kidney; gonad; islet of Langerhans; skin of abdomen; body of pancreas; skin of leg; muscle layer of sigmoid colon / Top expressed in: lobe of liver; left lobe of liver; right kidney; medullary collecting duct; islet of Langerhans; footplate; human kidney; renal cortex; yolk sac; proximal tubule; More reference expression data
BioGPS	n/a
Gene ontology
Molecular function	G protein-coupled receptor activity; guanyl-nucleotide exchange factor activity; signal transducer activity; peptide hormone binding; glucagon receptor activity; transmembrane signaling receptor activity; G protein-coupled peptide receptor activity
Cellular component	integral component of membrane; endosome; membrane; plasma membrane; integral component of plasma membrane
Biological process	glucose homeostasis; response to nutrient; adenylate cyclase-modulating G protein-coupled receptor signaling pathway; cellular response to glucagon stimulus; generation of precursor metabolites and energy; regulation of glycogen metabolic process; regulation of blood pressure; cell surface receptor signaling pathway; hormone-mediated signaling pathway; response to starvation; signal transduction; exocytosis; adenylate cyclase-activating G protein-coupled receptor signaling pathway; G protein-coupled receptor signaling pathway
Sources:Amigo / QuickGO
Orthologs
Databases	NCBI: entry; OMA: entry
Species	Human	Mouse
Entrez	2642	14527
Ensembl	ENSG00000215644; ENSG00000288269	ENSMUSG00000025127
UniProt	P47871	Q61606
RefSeq (mRNA)	NM_000160	NM_008101
RefSeq (protein)	NP_000151	NP_032127
Location (UCSC)	Chr 17: 81.8 – 81.81 Mb	Chr 11: 120.42 – 120.43 Mb
PubMed search
- Wikidata
View/Edit Human	View/Edit Mouse

The glucagon receptor is a 62 kDa protein that is activated by glucagon and is a member of the class B G-protein coupled family of receptors (secretin receptor family), coupled to G_{s} and to a lesser extent G_{q}, & potentially G_{i}. Stimulation of the G_{s} receptor results in the activation of adenylate cyclase, which in turn leads to increased levels of the secondary messengers intracellular cAMP and calcium. In humans, the glucagon receptor is encoded by the GCGR gene.

Glucagon receptors are mainly expressed in liver and in kidney with lesser amounts found in heart, adipose tissue, spleen, thymus, adrenal glands, pancreas, cerebral cortex, and gastrointestinal tract.

== Signal transduction pathway ==
A glucagon receptor, upon binding with the signaling molecule glucagon, initiates a signal transduction pathway that begins with the activation of adenylate cyclase, which in turn produces cyclic AMP (cAMP). Protein kinase A, whose activation is dependent on the increased levels of cAMP, is responsible for the ensuing cellular response in the form of protein kinase 1 and 2. The ligand-bound glucagon receptor can also initiate a concurrent signaling pathway that is independent of cAMP by activating phospholipase C. Phospholipase C produces DAG and IP_{3} from PIP_{2}, a phospholipid phospholipase C cleaves off of the plasma membrane. Ca^{2+} stores inside the cell release Ca^{2+} when its calcium channels are bound by IP_{3.}

== Structure ==
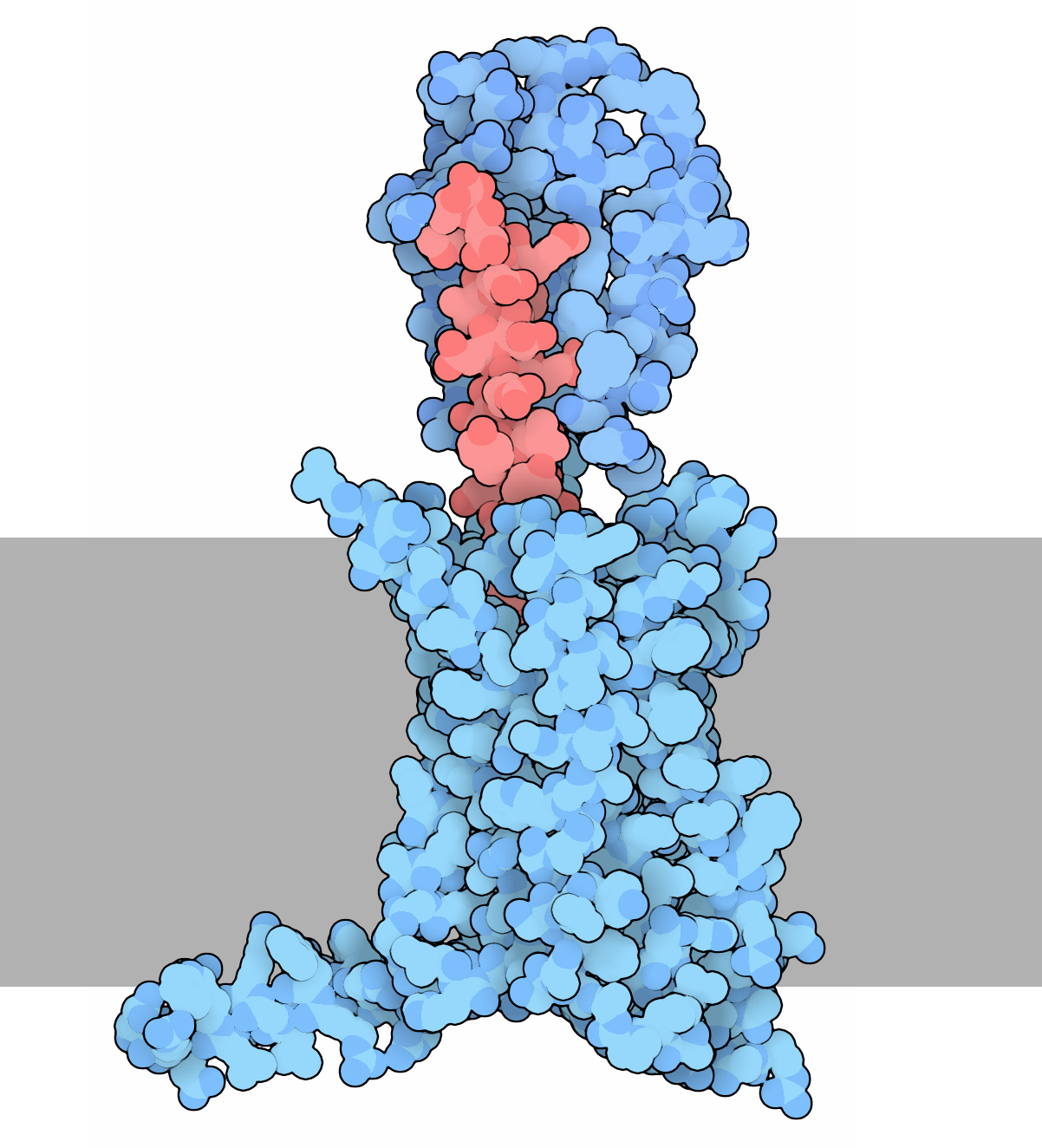
glucagon/glucagon receptor (blue) with glucagon bound (pink)

The 3D crystallographic structures of the seven transmembrane helical domain (7TM) and the extracellular domain (ECD) and an electron microscopy (EM) map of full length glucagon receptor have been determined. Furthermore, the structural dynamics of an active state complex of the Glucagon receptor, Glucagon, the Receptor activity-modifying protein, and the G-protein C-terminus has been determined using a computational and experimental approach.

== Clinical significance ==
A missense mutation at 17q25 in the GCGR gene is associated with diabetes mellitus type 2.

Inactivating mutation of glucagon receptor in humans causes resistance to glucagon and is associated with pancreatic alpha cell hyperplasia, nesidioblastosis, hyperglucagonemia, and pancreatic neuroendocrine tumors, also known as Mahvash disease.
