= Death-associated protein 6 =

Protein found in humans

DAXX
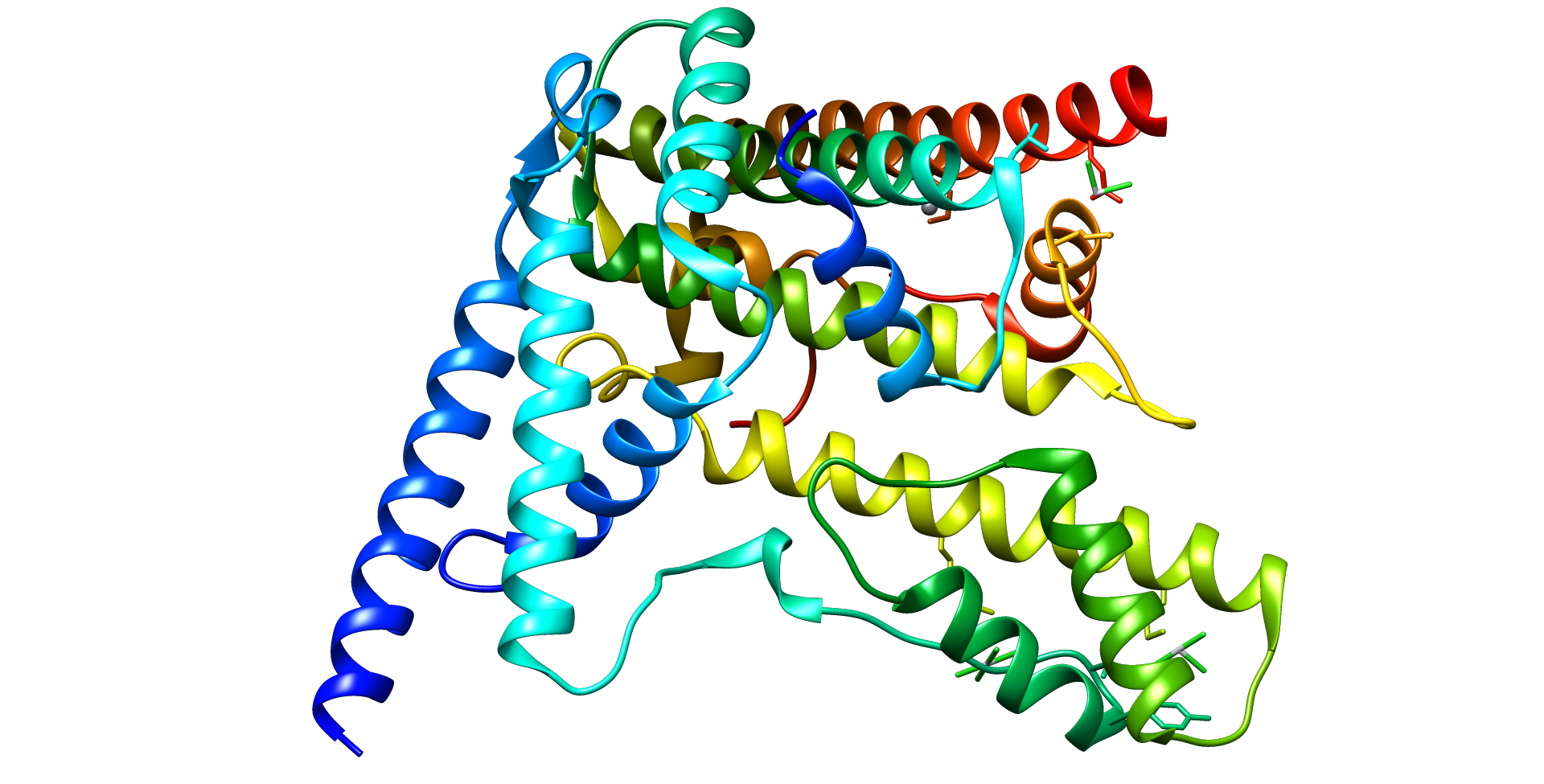
Available structures
PDB	Ortholog search: PDBe RCSB
PDB	List of PDB id codes 4HGA, 2KQS, 2KZS, 2KZU, 4H9N, 4H9O, 4H9P, 4H9Q, 4H9R, 4H9S

Identifiers
- Aliases: DAXX, BING2, DAP6, EAP1, death-domain associated protein, death domain associated protein, SMIM40
- External IDs: OMIM: 603186; MGI: 1197015; HomoloGene: 1033; GeneCards: DAXX; OMA:DAXX - orthologs

Gene location (Human)
Chr.	Chromosome 6 (human)
Band	6p21.32	Start	33,318,558 bp
Band	6p21.32	End	33,323,016 bp

Gene location (Mouse)
Chr.	Chromosome 17 (mouse)
Band	17 B1|17 17.98 cM	Start	34,128,388 bp
Band	17 B1|17 17.98 cM	End	34,134,564 bp
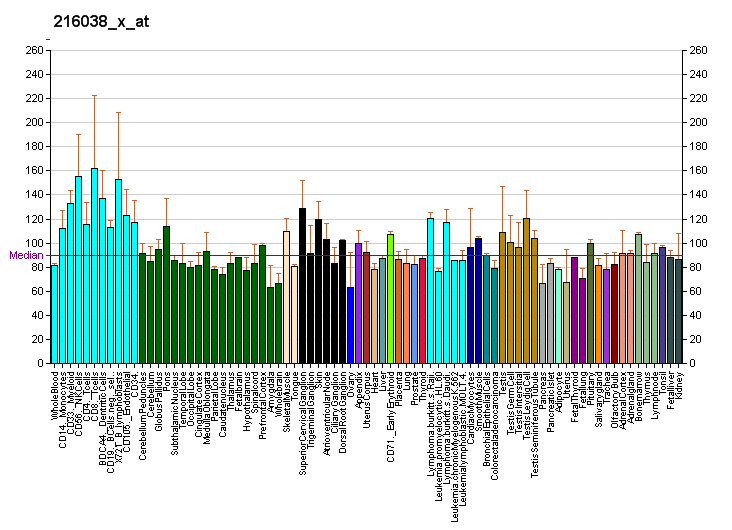

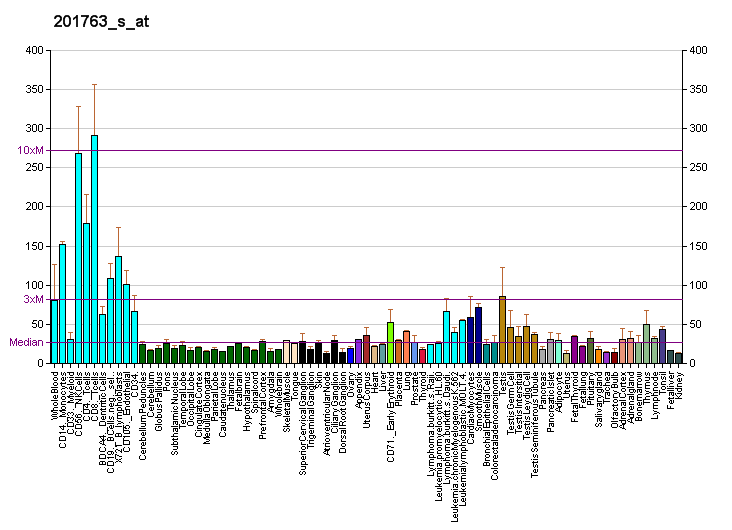
RNA expression pattern
Bgee	Human / Mouse (ortholog); Top expressed in: granulocyte; lymph node; appendix; spleen; ventricular zone; stromal cell of endometrium; blood; left testis; left adrenal gland; left uterine tube / Top expressed in: spermatocyte; spermatid; genital tubercle; seminiferous tubule; granulocyte; zygote; tail of embryo; internal carotid artery; secondary oocyte; thymus; More reference expression data
BioGPS	More reference expression data
Gene ontology
Molecular function	heat shock protein binding; protein homodimerization activity; protein N-terminus binding; histone binding; p53 binding; protein kinase activator activity; protein binding; enzyme binding; ubiquitin protein ligase binding; transcription factor binding; androgen receptor binding; protein kinase binding; transcription coactivator activity; transcription corepressor activity; SUMO binding; protein heterodimerization activity
Cellular component	cytosol; PML body; SWI/SNF superfamily-type complex; chromosome; nucleolus; chromosome, centromeric region; nucleoplasm; nucleus; cytoplasm; nuclear body
Biological process	androgen receptor signaling pathway; chromatin remodeling; nucleosome assembly; positive regulation of protein phosphorylation; regulation of transcription, DNA-templated; regulation of protein ubiquitination; positive regulation of neuron death; transcription, DNA-templated; viral process; negative regulation of transcription, DNA-templated; extrinsic apoptotic signaling pathway via death domain receptors; positive regulation of protein kinase activity; apoptotic process; cellular response to heat; Unfolded Protein Response; cellular response to cadmium ion; cellular response to copper ion; cellular response to diamide; cellular response to sodium arsenite; chromatin organization; positive regulation of nucleic acid-templated transcription; regulation of apoptotic process
Sources:Amigo / QuickGO
Orthologs
Species	Human	Mouse
Entrez	1616	13163
Ensembl	ENSG00000231617; ENSG00000206206; ENSG00000227046; ENSG00000206279; ENSG00000204209 ENSG00000229396	ENSMUSG00000002307
UniProt	Q9UER7; Q4VX54	O35613
RefSeq (mRNA)	NM_001141969; NM_001141970; NM_001254717; NM_001350	NM_001199733; NM_007829; NM_001355704
RefSeq (protein)	NP_001135441; NP_001135442; NP_001241646; NP_001341	NP_001186662; NP_031855; NP_001342633
Location (UCSC)	Chr 6: 33.32 – 33.32 Mb	Chr 17: 34.13 – 34.13 Mb
PubMed search
- Wikidata
View/Edit Human	View/Edit Mouse

Death-associated protein 6 also known as Daxx is a protein that in humans is encoded by the DAXX gene.

== Function ==
Daxx, a Death domain-associated protein, was first discovered through its cytoplasmic interaction with the classical death receptor Fas. It has been associated with heterochromatin and PML-NBs (Promyelocytic Leukaemia nuclear bodies) and has been implicated in many nuclear processes including transcription and cell cycle regulation.

This gene encodes a multifunctional protein that resides in multiple locations in the nucleus and the cytoplasm. Daxx serves as an H3.3 specific histone chaperone, interacting with an H3.3/H4 dimer. It interacts with a wide variety of proteins, such as apoptosis antigen Fas, centromere protein C, and transcription factor erythroblastosis virus E26 oncogene homolog 1 (ETS1). In the nucleus, the encoded protein functions as a potent transcription repressor that binds to sumoylated transcription factors. Its repression can be relieved by the sequestration of this protein into promyelocytic leukemia nuclear bodies or nucleoli. This protein also associates with centromeres in the G2 phase. In the cytoplasm, the encoded protein may function to regulate apoptosis. The subcellular localization and function of this protein are modulated by post-translational modifications, including sumoylation, phosphorylation and polyubiquitination.

== Structure and localization ==
Daxx is uniformly expressed throughout the body, except in the testes and thymus, which have especially high expression of the protein. At the level of the cell, Daxx is found in the cytoplasm, interacting with Fas-receptor or other cytoplasmic molecules, as well as in the nucleus, where it interacts with some subnuclear structures. Several additional interacting proteins are known, but not always is there an understanding of the specific function and relevance of this interaction.

=== Nuclear ===
When the PML-NB is absent or disrupted, Daxx is delocalized and apoptosis does not occur. This interaction was demonstrated when PML-NB disrupted cells were treated and Daxx relocalized with the PML-NB. ATRX, a centromeric heterochromatin component co-localizes with Daxx. This partnership is found mainly in the S-phase of the cell cycle. No expression of Daxx leads to malfunction of S phase and cells with two nuclei are formed. Another centromeric component, CENP-C, associates with Daxx during interphase. While at first Daxx was said to be a "death protein", it is suggested that associating with centromeric components leads to another function of Daxx.

=== Cytoplasmic and membrane ===
Fas-receptor stimulation causes Daxx to translocate out of the nucleus and into the cytoplasm. The breakdown of glucose produces reactive oxygen species (ROS). These induce extracellular Daxx to translocalize into the cytoplasm following an association with ASK1 (Apoptosis signal-regulating kinase1). Another mechanism for exogenous Daxx import involves CRM1. This transport mechanism is phosphorylation dependent. Nevertheless, it is not known whether the Fas-receptor stimuli or the ASK1 overexpression are caused by ROS or CRM1 mediated export.

== Role in apoptosis ==
=== Fas-induced ===
After Fas stimulation, Daxx is activated and plays its role of pro-apoptotic protein in activating the c-JUN-N-Terminal Kinase (JNK) pathway. This pathway normally regulates stress-induced cell death. It is also essential for development of nerval system by programmed cell death. The real apoptotic process starts after activating this pathway. Daxx does not activate JNK itself but rather the upstream JNK kinase kinase ASK1. Some kind of positive feedback system was also discovered; JNK activates HIPK2, which stands for the translocation of nuclear Daxx to the cytoplasm. In turn, Daxx activates ASK1.

=== TGF-β regulated ===
TGF-β regulates a variety of different cellular developmental processes including growth, differentiation, proliferation, and cell death. Daxx interacts with the TGF-β type II receptor by binding of C-terminal domain of the protein. When the cell is treated with TGF-β, HIPK2, a nuclear kinase, phosphorylates Daxx and the activated Daxx in turn activates the JNK pathway (see "The Daxx Pathway" figure).

=== Miscellaneous mechanisms ===
Glucose breakdown produces ROS, which leads to Daxx production and relocalization, activating JNK pathway in turn. Another inducer of Daxx production is the exposure to UV-radiation. ASK1 will be transported to the nucleus when UV-irradiation is used to treat the cell. It is still unknown as to whether ASK1 binds Daxx, due to UV-irradiation. Another important cell death-property of Daxx is the association with PML-NB. It was shown that Daxx associates with Pml only when exposed to high oxidative stress or UV-irradiation. Another study showed loss of Daxx pro-apoptotic function in case of a mutant without Pml.

=== Anti-apoptotic function ===
A rather surprising property of Daxx is its anti-apoptotic function. When Daxx was not expressed or disrupted during embryonic development, it resulted in an early stage lethality. Other studies showed that lack of Daxx gene caused a higher apoptotic rate in embryonic stem cells. Only when Daxx was bound to Pml were apoptosis rates higher, suggesting that associated cytoplasmic Daxx has the role of an anti-apoptotic molecule.

The DAXX Pathway

== Other functions ==
The omnipresence of Daxx in the cell nucleus suggests that the protein may also function as a transcription factor. Although it contains no known DNA-binding domains, Daxx can interact and suppress several transcription factors, such as p53, p73, and NF-κB. Proteins other than transcription factors are also blocked or inhibited by Daxx, such as the TGF-β pathway regulator, Smad4, conferring upon Daxx a major role in TGF-β signaling.
