= Necrolytic migratory erythema =

Red, blistering skin rash

- Other names: NME
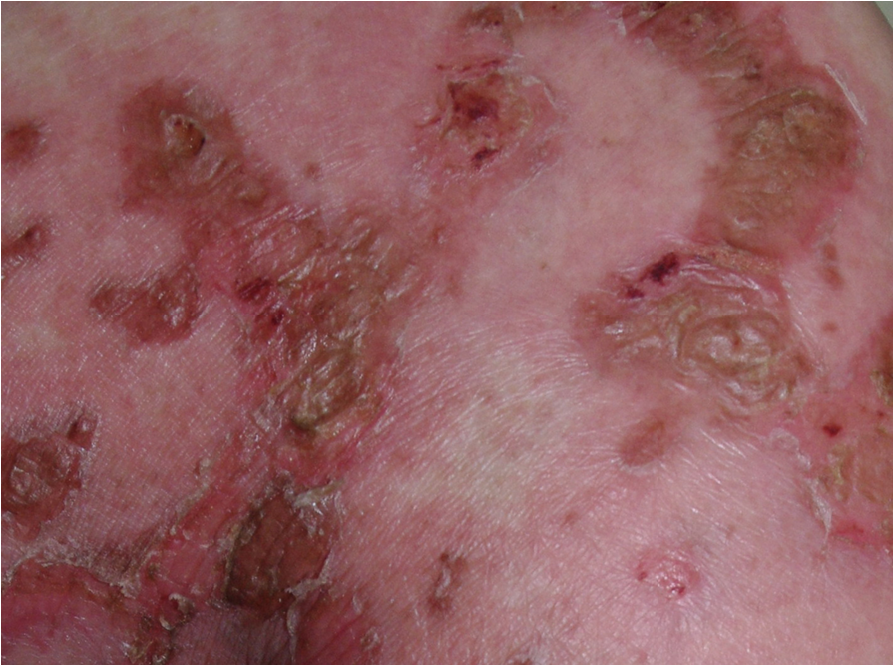
- Necrolytic migratory erythema in the gluteal area
- Specialty: Dermatology

Necrolytic migratory erythema (NME) is a red, blistering rash that spreads across the skin. It particularly affects the skin around the mouth and distal extremities; but may also be found on the lower abdomen, buttocks, perineum, and groin. It is strongly associated with glucagonoma, a glucagon-producing tumor of the pancreas, but is also seen in a number of other conditions including liver disease and intestinal malabsorption.

== Signs and symptoms ==
=== Clinical features ===
NME features a characteristic skin eruption of red patches with irregular borders, intact and ruptured vesicles, and crust formation. It commonly affects the limbs and skin surrounding the lips, although less commonly the abdomen, perineum, thighs, buttocks, and groin may be affected. Frequently these areas may be left dry or fissured as a result. All stages of lesion development may be observed synchronously. The initial eruption may be exacerbated by pressure or trauma to the affected areas.

=== Associated conditions ===
William Becker first described an association between NME and glucagonoma in 1942 and since then, NME has been described in as many as 70% of persons with a glucagonoma. NME is considered part of the glucagonoma syndrome, which is associated with hyperglucagonemia, diabetes mellitus, and hypoaminoacidemia. When NME is identified in the absence of a glucagonoma, it may be considered "pseudoglucagonoma syndrome". Less common than NME with glucagonoma, pseudoglucagonoma syndrome may occur in a number of systemic disorders:

- Celiac disease
- Ulcerative colitis
- Crohn's disease
- Hepatic cirrhosis
- Hepatocellular carcinoma
- Lung cancer, including small cell lung cancer
- Tumors that secrete insulin- or insulin-like growth factor 2
- Duodenal cancer

== Cause ==
The cause of NME is unknown, although various mechanisms have been suggested. These include hyperglucagonemia, zinc deficiency, fatty acid deficiency, hypoaminoacidemia, and liver disease.

== Mechanism ==
The pathogenesis is also unknown.

== Diagnosis ==
=== Histology ===
The histopathologic features of NME are nonspecific and include:

- epidermal necrosis
- subcorneal pustules
- confluent parakeratosis, epidermal hyperplasia, and marked papillary dermal hyperplasia in a psoriasiform pattern
- angioplasia of papillary dermis
- suppurative folliculitis

The vacuolated, pale, swollen epidermal cells and necrosis of the superficial epidermis are most characteristic. Immunofluorescence is usually negative.

== Management ==
Managing the original condition, glucagonoma, by octreotide or surgery. After resection, the rash typically resolves within days.

== See also ==
- List of cutaneous conditions
