= Hyperaminoacidemia =

Hyperaminoacidemia refers to the condition of having an excess of amino acids in the bloodstream. There is evidence that hyperaminoacidemia increases protein synthesis and anabolism.
