= Alpha cell =

Glucagon secreting cell

- Pancreatic islets (islets of Langerhans).

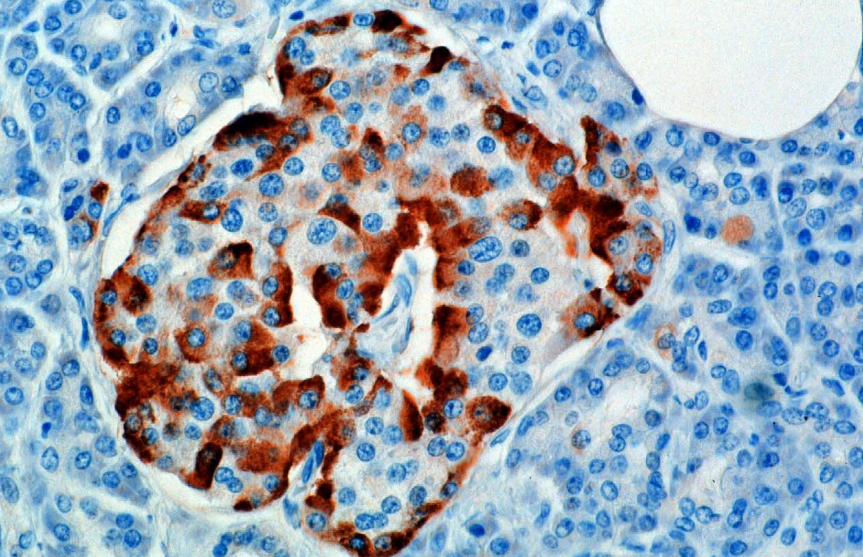
- Alpha cells in red

Details
- System: Endocrine
- Location: Pancreatic islet
- Function: Glucagon secretion

Identifiers
- TH: H3.04.02.0.00025
- FMA: 70585

Alpha cells (α-cells) are endocrine cells that are found in the Islets of Langerhans in the pancreas. Alpha cells secrete the peptide hormone glucagon in order to increase glucose levels in the blood stream.

== Discovery ==
Islets of Langerhans were first discussed by Paul Langerhans in his medical thesis in 1869. This same year, Édouard Laguesse named them after Langerhans. At first, there was a lot of controversy about what the Islets were made of and what they did. It appeared that all of the cells were the same within the Islet, but were histologically distinct from acini cells. Laguesse discovered that the cells within the Islets of Langerhans contained granules that distinguished them from acini cells. He also determined that these granules were products of the metabolism of the cells in which they were contained. Michael Lane was the one to discover that alpha cells were histologically different than beta cells in 1907.

Before the function of alpha cells was discovered, the function of their metabolic product, glucagon, was discovered. The discovery of the function of glucagon coincides with the discovery of the function of insulin. In 1921, Banting and Best were testing pancreatic extracts in dogs that had had their pancreas removed. They discovered that "insulin-induced hypoglycemia was preceded by a transient, rather mild hyperglycemia..." Murlin is credited with the discovery of glucagon because in 1923 they suggested that the early hyperglycemic effect observed by Banting and Best was due to "a contaminant with glucogenic properties that they also proposed to call 'glucagon,' or the mobilizer of glucose". In 1948, Sutherland and de Duve established that alpha cells in the pancreas were the source of glucagon.

== Anatomy ==
Alpha cells are endocrine cells, meaning they secrete a hormone, in this case glucagon. Alpha cells store this glucagon in secretory vesicles that typically have an electron dense core and a grayish outer edge. It is believed that alpha cells make up approximately 20% of endocrine cells within the pancreas. Alpha cells are most commonly found on the dorsal side of the pancreas and are very rarely found on the ventral side of the pancreas. Alpha cells are typically found in compact Islets of Langerhans, which are themselves typically found in the body of the pancreas.

== Function ==
Alpha cells function in the maintenance of blood glucose levels. Alpha cells are stimulated to produce glucagon in response to hypoglycemia, epinephrine, amino acids, other hormones, and neurotransmitters.

=== Glucagon Secretion and Control of Gluconeogenesis ===
Glucagon functions to signal the liver to begin gluconeogenesis which increases glucose levels in the blood. Glucagon will bind to the glucagon receptors on the plasma membranes of hepatocytes (liver cells). This ligand binding causes the activation of adenylate cyclase, which causes the creation of cyclic AMP (cAMP). As the intracellular concentration of cAMP rises, protein kinase A (PKA) is activated and phosphorylates the transcription factor cAMP Response Element Binding (CREB) protein. CREB then induces transcription of glucose-6-phosphatase and phosphoenolpyruvate carboxylase (PEPCK). These enzymes increase gluconeogenic activity. PKA also phosphorylates phospho-fructokinase 2 (PFK2)/fructose 2,6-biphsophatase (FBPase2), inhibiting PFK2 and activating FBPase2. This inhibition decreases intracellular levels of fructose 2,6-biphosphate and increases intracellular levels of fructose 6-phosphate which decreases glycolytic activity and increases gluconeogenic activity. PKA also phosphorylates pyruvate kinase which causes an increase in intracellular levels of fructose 1,6-biphosphate and decreases intracellular levels of pyruvate, further decreasing glycolytic activity. The most important action of PKA in regulating gluconeogenesis is the phosphorylation of phosphorylase kinase which acts to initiate the glycogenolysis reaction, which is the conversion of glycogen to glucose, by converting glycogen to glucose 1-phosphate.

Glucagon is a peptide hormone derived from the proglucagon precursor. In pancreatic alpha cells, proglucagon is normally cleaved predominantly by protein convertase PC2 to generate glucagon. Under conditions of metabolic stress or beta cell injury, alpha cells can increase PC1/3 expression, resulting in alternative processing of proglucagon and production of glucagon-like peptide-1 (GLP-1) and other proglucagon-derived peptides normally associated with intestinal L-cells. Alpha cells exhibit little PC2 activity and hence produce little to no GLP-1 when healthy. In contrast, (intestinal) L-cells rely on PC1/3 to exclusively produce GLP-1 and GLP-2 from proglucagon instead of glucagon. The protein convertase switch may have protective and regenerative effect on beta cells. Another possibility is that alpha cells can potentially transdifferentiate into beta cells to replace lost beta cells.

== Regulation of glucagon secretion ==
There are several methods of control of the secretion of glucagon. The most well studied is through the action of extra-pancreatic glucose sensors, including neurons found in the brain and spinal cord, which exert control over the alpha cells in the pancreas. Indirect, non-neuronal control has also been found to influence secretion of glucagon.

=== Neuronal Control ===
The most well studied is through the action of extra-pancreatic glucose sensors, including neurons found in the brain, which exert control over the alpha cells in the pancreas. The pancreas is controlled by both the sympathetic nervous system and the parasympathetic nervous system, although the method these two systems use to control the pancreas appears to be different.

Sympathetic control of the pancreas appears to originate from the sympathetic preganglionic fibers in the lower thoracic and lumbar spinal cord. According to Travagli et al. "axons from these neurons exit the spinal cord through the ventral roots and supply either the paravertebral ganglia of the sympathetic chain via communicating rami of the thoracic and lumbar nerves, or the celiac and mesenteric ganglia via the splanchnic nerves. The catecholaminergic neurons of these ganglia innervate the intrapancreatic ganglia, islets and blood vessels..." The exact nature of the effect of sympathetic activation on the pancreas has been difficult to discern. However, a few things are known. It appears that stimulation of the splanchnic nerve lowers plasma insulin levels possibly through the action of α2 adrenoreceptors on beta cells. It has also been shown that stimulation of the splanchnic nerve increases glucagon secretion. Both of these findings together suggest that sympathetic stimulation of the pancreas is meant to maintain blood glucose levels during heightened arousal.

Parasympathetic control of the pancreas appears to originate from the Vagus nerve. Electrical and pharmacological stimulation of the Vagus nerve increases secretion of glucagon and insulin in most mammalian species, including humans. This suggests that the role of parasympathetic control is to maintain normal blood glucose concentration under normal conditions.

=== Non-neuronal Control ===
Non-neuronal control has been found to be indirect paracrine regulation through ions, hormones, and neurotransmitters. Zinc, insulin, serotonin, γ-aminobutyric acid, and γ-hydroxybutyrate, all of which are released by beta cells in the pancreas, have been found to suppress glucagon production in alpha cells. Delta cells also release somatostatin which has been found to inhibit glucagon secretion.

Zinc is secreted at the same time as insulin by the beta cells in the pancreas. It has been proposed to act as a paracrine signal to inhibit glucagon secretion in alpha cells. Zinc is transported into both alpha and beta cells by the zinc transporter ZnT8. This protein channel allows zinc to cross the plasma membrane into the cell. When ZnT8 is under-expressed, there is a marked increase in glucagon secretion. When ZnT8 is over-expressed, there is a marked decrease in glucagon secretion. The exact mechanism by which zinc inhibits glucagon secretion is not known.

Insulin has been shown to function as a paracrine signal to inhibit glucagon secretion by the alpha cells. However, this is not through a direct interaction. It appears that insulin functions to inhibit glucagon secretion through activation of delta cells to secrete somatostatin. Insulin binds to SGLT2 causing an increased glucose uptake into delta cells. SGLT2 is a sodium and glucose symporter, meaning that it brings glucose and sodium ions across the membrane at the same time in the same direction. This influx of sodium ions, in the right conditions, can cause a depolarization event across the membrane. This opens calcium channels, causing intracellular calcium levels to increase. This increase in the concentration of calcium in the cytosol activates ryanodine receptors on the endoplasmic reticulum which causes the release of more calcium into the cytosol. This increase in calcium causes the secretion of somatostatin by the delta cells.

Somatostatin inhibits glucagon secretion through the activation of SSTR2, a membrane bound protein that when activated causes a hyperpolarization of the membrane. This hyperpolarization causes voltage gated calcium channels to close, leading to a decrease in intracellular calcium levels. This causes a decrease in exocytosis. In the case of alpha cells, this causes a decrease in the secretion of glucagon.

Serotonin inhibits the secretion of glucagon through its receptors on the plasma membrane of alpha cells. Alpha cells have 5-HT1f receptors which are triggered by the binding of serotonin. Once activated, these receptors suppress the action of adenylyl cyclase, which suppresses the production of cAMP. The inhibition of the production of cAMP in turn suppresses the secretion of glucagon. Serotonin is considered a paracrine signal due to the close proximity of beta cells to alpha cells.

Glucose can also have a somewhat direct influence on glucagon secretion as well. This is through the influence of ATP. Cellular concentrations of ATP directly reflects the concentration of glucose in the blood. If the concentration of ATP drops in alpha cells, this causes potassium ion channels in the plasma membrane to close. This causes depolarization across the membrane causing calcium ion channels to open, allowing calcium to flood into the cell. This increase in the cellular concentration of calcium causes secretory vesicles containing glucagon to fuse with the plasma membrane, thus causing the secretion of glucagon from the pancreas.

== Medical significance ==
High levels of glucagon secretion has been implicated in both Type I and Type II diabetes. In fact, high levels of plasma glucagon is considered an early sign of the development of both Type I and Type II diabetes.

=== Type I Diabetes ===
It is thought that high glucagon levels and lack of insulin production are the main triggers for the metabolic issues associated with Type I diabetes, in particular maintaining normal blood glucose levels, formation of ketone bodies, and formation of urea. One finding of note is that the glucagon response to hypoglycemia is completely absent in patients with Type I diabetes. Consistently high glucagon concentrations in the blood can lead to diabetic ketoacidosis, which is when ketones from lipid breakdown build up in the blood, which can lead to dangerously low blood glucose levels, low potassium levels, and in extreme cases cerebral edema. It has been proposed that the reason for the high levels of glucagon found in the plasma of patients with Type I diabetes is the absence of beta cells producing insulin and the reciprocal effect this has on delta cells and the secretion of somatostatin.

=== Type II Diabetes ===
Patients with Type II diabetes will have elevated glucagon levels during a fast and after eating. These elevated glucagon levels over stimulate the liver to undergo gluconeogenesis, leading to elevated blood glucose levels. Consistently high blood glucose levels can lead to organ damage, neuropathy, blindness, cardiovascular issues and bone and joint problems. It is not entirely clear why glucagon levels are so high in patients with Type II diabetes. One theory is that the alpha cells have become resistant to the inhibitory effects of glucose and insulin and do not respond properly to them. Another theory is that nutrient stimulation of the gastrointestinal tract, thus the secretion of gastric inhibitory polypeptide and Glucagon-like peptide-1, is a very important factor in the elevated secretion of glucagon.

== In other species ==
There is much controversy as to the effects of various artemisinin derivatives on α-cell-to-β-cell differentiation in rodents and zebrafish. Li et al., 2017 find artemisinin itself forces α⇨β conversion in rodents (via gephyrin) and zebrafish while Ackermann et al., 2018 find artesunate does not and van der Meulen et al., 2018 find the same absence of effect for artemether (although artemether does inhibit ARX). (Shin et al., 2019 further finds no such effect for GABA in rhesus macaque, although GABA is not an artemisinin but has a related action.) Both Eizirik & Gurzov 2018 and Yi et al., 2020 consider it possible that these are all legitimately varying results from varying combinations of substance, subject, and environment. On the other hand, a large number of reviewers are uncertain whether these are separate effects, instead questioning the validity of Li on the basis of Ackermann and van der Meulen – perhaps GABA receptor agonists as a whole are not β-cell-ergic. Coppieters et al., 2020 goes further, highlighting Ackermann and van der Meulen as publications that catch an unreplicatable scientific result, Li.

== See also ==
- Glucagonoma
- Beta cell
- Delta cell
- List of human cell types derived from the germ layers
- List of distinct cell types in the adult human body
