= Endocrine system =

Hormone-producing glands of a body

- Main glands of the human endocrine system

Details

Identifiers
- Latin: systema endocrinum
- MeSH: D004703
- FMA: 9668

The endocrine system is a messenger system in an organism comprising feedback loops of hormones that are released by internal glands directly into the circulatory system and that target and regulate distant organs. In vertebrates, the hypothalamus is the neural control center for all endocrine systems.

In humans, the major endocrine glands are the thyroid, parathyroid, pituitary, pineal, and adrenal glands, and the (male) testis and (female) ovaries. The hypothalamus, pancreas, and thymus also function as endocrine glands, among other functions. (The hypothalamus and pituitary glands are organs of the neuroendocrine system. One of the most important functions of the hypothalamus—it is located in the brain adjacent to the pituitary gland—is to link the endocrine system to the nervous system via the pituitary gland.) Other organs, such as the kidneys, also have roles within the endocrine system by secreting certain hormones. The study of the endocrine system and its disorders is known as endocrinology. The thyroid secretes thyroxine, the pituitary secretes growth hormone, the pineal secretes melatonin, the testis secretes testosterone, and the ovaries secrete estrogen and progesterone.

Glands that signal each other in sequence are often referred to as an axis, such as the hypothalamic–pituitary–adrenal axis. In addition to the specialized endocrine organs mentioned above, many other organs that are part of other body systems have secondary endocrine functions, including bone, kidneys, liver, heart and gonads. For example, the kidney secretes the endocrine hormone erythropoietin. Hormones can be amino acid complexes, steroids, eicosanoids, leukotrienes, or prostaglandins.

The endocrine system is contrasted both to exocrine glands, which secrete hormones to the outside of the body, and to the system known as paracrine signalling between cells over a relatively short distance. Endocrine glands have no ducts, are vascular, and commonly have intracellular vacuoles or granules that store their hormones. In contrast, exocrine glands, such as salivary glands, mammary glands, and submucosal glands within the gastrointestinal tract, tend to be much less vascular and have ducts or a hollow lumen. Endocrinology is a branch of internal medicine.

== Structure ==
=== Major endocrine systems ===
The human endocrine system consists of several systems that operate via feedback loops. Several important feedback systems are mediated via the hypothalamus and pituitary.

- TRH – TSH – T3/T4
- GnRH – LH/FSH – sex hormones
- CRH – ACTH – cortisol
- Renin – angiotensin – aldosterone
- Leptin vs. ghrelin

=== Glands ===
Endocrine glands are glands of the endocrine system that secrete their products, hormones, directly into interstitial spaces where they are absorbed into blood rather than through a duct. The major glands of the endocrine system include the pineal gland, pituitary gland, pancreas, ovaries, testes, thyroid gland, parathyroid gland, hypothalamus and adrenal glands. The hypothalamus and pituitary gland are neuroendocrine organs.

The hypothalamus and the anterior pituitary are two out of the three endocrine glands that are important in cell signaling. They are both part of the HPA axis which is known to play a role in cell signaling in the nervous system.

The hypothalamus is a key regulator of the autonomic nervous system. The endocrine system has three sets of endocrine outputs which include the magnocellular system, the parvocellular system, and autonomic intervention. The magnocellular is involved in the expression of oxytocin or vasopressin.

The main role of the anterior pituitary gland is to produce and secrete tropic hormones. Some examples of tropic hormones secreted by the anterior pituitary gland include TSH, ACTH, GH, LH, and FSH. The parvocellular neurosecretory cell is involved in controlling the secretion of hormones from the anterior pituitary.

=== Endocrine cells ===
There are many types of specialized endocrine cells that make up the larger tissues and glands of the endocrine system. The endocrine cells release hormones as molecular signals in endocrine signaling that target cells in more distant locations. In animals there are more than fifty such hormones released by the different endocrine glands.

The pituitary gland, and the hypothalamus dominate most of the endocrine system. The pituitary gland is in two parts – the anterior pituitary, and the posterior pituitary. The posterior pituitary gland does not produce any hormone but stores and secretes hormones such as antidiuretic hormone (ADH) which is synthesized by supraoptic nucleus of hypothalamus and oxytocin which is synthesized by paraventricular nucleus of hypothalamus. ADH functions to help the body to retain water; this is important in maintaining a homeostatic balance between blood solutions and water. Oxytocin functions to induce uterine contractions, stimulate lactation, and allows for ejaculation.

The pineal gland produces melatonin.

The follicular cells of the thyroid gland produce and secrete the thyroid hormones T_{3} and T_{4} in response to elevated levels of TRH, produced by the hypothalamus, and subsequent elevated levels of TSH, produced by the anterior pituitary, which further regulates the metabolic activity and rate of all cells, including cell growth and tissue differentiation.

The parathyroid glands produce and secrete parathyroid hormone in response to low calcium. The epithelial cells of the parathyroid glands are richly supplied with blood from the Inferior thyroid artery and superior thyroid artery. Parathyroid hormone acts on bone, the kidneys, and the GI tract to increase calcium reabsorption and phosphate excretion. In addition, it also stimulates the conversion of vitamin D to its most active variant, 1,25-dihydroxyvitamin D_{3}, which further stimulates calcium absorption in the GI tract.

The pancreas contains nearly 1 to 2 million pancreatic islets the organ's endocrine cells that secrete hormones, and acini. The acini secrete digestive enzymes. The pancreatic endocrine cells include alpha cells that produce and secrete the glucagon to maintain homeostatic blood sugar. In response to low blood sugar levels, the release of glucagon stimulates glycogen stores in the liver to release sugar into the bloodstream to raise blood sugar to normal levels. Pancreatic beta cells make up 60% of the cells in the islets. Along with alpha cells, beta cells help to maintain glucose levels in the body. In response to high blood sugar, beta cells secrete insulin, a hypoglycemic hormone. Insulin decreases blood glucose level by helping cells to take up and metabolize glucose, and by stopping the liver from releasing more glucose. Insulin also performs other metabolic functions: causing muscle cells to take up amino acids, and inhibiting the breakdown and release of fats. Delta cells (5%) in the islets produce regulatory somatostatin.

Other glands include the thymus, the adrenal glands including the adrenal cortex, and the adrenal medulla, the ovary, the testicle and its Leydig cells

== Development ==
The fetal endocrine system is one of the first systems to develop during prenatal development.

=== Adrenal glands ===
The fetal adrenal cortex can be identified within four weeks of gestation. The adrenal cortex originates from the thickening of the intermediate mesoderm. At five to six weeks of gestation, the mesonephros differentiates into a tissue known as the genital ridge. The genital ridge produces the steroidogenic cells for both the gonads and the adrenal cortex. The adrenal medulla is derived from ectodermal cells. Cells that will become adrenal tissue move retroperitoneally to the upper portion of the mesonephros. At seven weeks of gestation, the adrenal cells are joined by sympathetic cells that originate from the neural crest to form the adrenal medulla. At the end of the eighth week, the adrenal glands have been encapsulated and have formed a distinct organ above the developing kidneys. At birth, the adrenal glands weigh approximately eight to nine grams (twice that of the adult adrenal glands) and are 0.5% of the total body weight. At 25 weeks, the adult adrenal cortex zone develops and is responsible for the primary synthesis of steroids during the early postnatal weeks.

=== Thyroid gland ===
The thyroid gland develops from two different clusterings of embryonic cells. One part is from the thickening of the pharyngeal floor, which serves as the precursor of the thyroxine (T_{4}) producing follicular cells. The other part is from the caudal extensions of the fourth pharyngobranchial pouches which results in the parafollicular calcitonin-secreting cells. These two structures are apparent by 16 to 17 days of gestation. Around the 24th day of gestation, the foramen cecum, a thin, flask-like diverticulum of the median anlage develops. At approximately 24 to 32 days of gestation the median anlage develops into a bilobed structure. By 50 days of gestation, the medial and lateral anlage have fused together. At 12 weeks of gestation, the fetal thyroid is capable of storing iodine for the production of TRH, TSH, and free thyroid hormone. At 20 weeks, the fetus is able to implement feedback mechanisms for the production of thyroid hormones. During fetal development, T_{4} is the major thyroid hormone being produced while triiodothyronine (T_{3}) and its inactive derivative, reverse T_{3}, are not detected until the third trimester.

=== Parathyroid glands ===
A lateral and ventral view of an embryo showing the third (inferior) and fourth (superior) parathyroid glands during the 6th week of embryogenesis

Once the embryo reaches four weeks of gestation, the parathyroid glands begin to develop. The human embryo forms five sets of endoderm-lined pharyngeal pouches. The third and fourth pouch are responsible for developing into the inferior and superior parathyroid glands, respectively. The third pharyngeal pouch encounters the developing thyroid gland and they migrate down to the lower poles of the thyroid lobes. The fourth pharyngeal pouch later encounters the developing thyroid gland and migrates to the upper poles of the thyroid lobes. At 14 weeks of gestation, the parathyroid glands begin to enlarge from 0.1 mm in diameter to approximately 1 – 2 mm at birth. The developing parathyroid glands are physiologically functional beginning in the second trimester.

Studies in mice have shown that interfering with the HOX15 gene can cause parathyroid gland aplasia, which suggests the gene plays an important role in the development of the parathyroid gland. The genes, TBX1, CRKL, GATA3, GCM2, and SOX3 have also been shown to play a crucial role in the formation of the parathyroid gland. Mutations in TBX1 and CRKL genes are correlated with DiGeorge syndrome, while mutations in GATA3 have also resulted in a DiGeorge-like syndrome. Malformations in the GCM2 gene have resulted in hypoparathyroidism. Studies on SOX3 gene mutations have demonstrated that it plays a role in parathyroid development. These mutations also lead to varying degrees of hypopituitarism.

=== Pancreas ===
The human fetal pancreas begins to develop by the fourth week of gestation. Five weeks later, the pancreatic alpha and beta cells have begun to emerge. Reaching eight to ten weeks into development, the pancreas starts producing insulin, glucagon, somatostatin, and pancreatic polypeptide. During the early stages of fetal development, the number of pancreatic alpha cells outnumbers the number of pancreatic beta cells. The alpha cells reach their peak in the middle stage of gestation. From the middle stage until term, the beta cells continue to increase in number until they reach an approximate 1:1 ratio with the alpha cells. The insulin concentration within the fetal pancreas is 3.6 pmol/g at seven to ten weeks, which rises to 30 pmol/g at 16–25 weeks of gestation. Near term, the insulin concentration increases to 93 pmol/g. The endocrine cells have dispersed throughout the body within 10 weeks. At 31 weeks of development, the islets of Langerhans have differentiated.

While the fetal pancreas has functional beta cells by 14 to 24 weeks of gestation, the amount of insulin that is released into the bloodstream is relatively low. In a study of pregnant women carrying fetuses in the mid-gestation and near term stages of development, the fetuses did not have an increase in plasma insulin levels in response to injections of high levels of glucose. In contrast to insulin, the fetal plasma glucagon levels are relatively high and continue to increase during development. At the mid-stage of gestation, the glucagon concentration is 6 μg/g, compared to 2 μg/g in adult humans. Just like insulin, fetal glucagon plasma levels do not change in response to an infusion of glucose. However, a study of an infusion of alanine into pregnant women was shown to increase the cord blood and maternal glucagon concentrations, demonstrating a fetal response to amino acid exposure.

As such, while the fetal pancreatic alpha and beta islet cells have fully developed and are capable of hormone synthesis during the remaining fetal maturation, the islet cells are relatively immature in their capacity to produce glucagon and insulin. This is thought to be a result of the relatively stable levels of fetal serum glucose concentrations achieved via maternal transfer of glucose through the placenta. On the other hand, the stable fetal serum glucose levels could be attributed to the absence of pancreatic signaling initiated by incretins during feeding. In addition, the fetal pancreatic islets cells are unable to sufficiently produce cAMP and rapidly degrade cAMP by phosphodiesterase necessary to secrete glucagon and insulin.

During fetal development, the storage of glycogen is controlled by fetal glucocorticoids and placental lactogen. Fetal insulin is responsible for increasing glucose uptake and lipogenesis during the stages leading up to birth. Fetal cells contain a higher amount of insulin receptors in comparison to adults cells and fetal insulin receptors are not downregulated in cases of hyperinsulinemia. In comparison, fetal haptic glucagon receptors are lowered in comparison to adult cells and the glycemic effect of glucagon is blunted. This temporary physiological change aids the increased rate of fetal development during the final trimester. Poorly managed maternal diabetes mellitus is linked to fetal macrosomia, increased risk of miscarriage, and defects in fetal development. Maternal hyperglycemia is also linked to increased insulin levels and beta cell hyperplasia in the post-term infant. Children of diabetic mothers are at an increased risk for conditions such as: polycythemia, renal vein thrombosis, hypocalcemia, respiratory distress syndrome, jaundice, cardiomyopathy, congenital heart disease, and improper organ development.

=== Gonads ===
The reproductive system begins development at four to five weeks of gestation with germ cell migration. The bipotential gonad results from the collection of the medioventral region of the urogenital ridge. At the five-week point, the developing gonads break away from the adrenal primordium. Gonadal differentiation begins 42 days following conception.

==== Male gonadal development ====
For males, the testes form at six fetal weeks and the sertoli cells begin developing by the eight week of gestation. SRY, the sex-determining locus, serves to differentiate the Sertoli cells. The Sertoli cells are the point of origin for anti-Müllerian hormone. Once synthesized, the anti-Müllerian hormone initiates the ipsilateral regression of the Müllerian tract and inhibits the development of female internal features. At 10 weeks of gestation, the Leydig cells begin to produce androgen hormones. The androgen hormone dihydrotestosterone is responsible for the development of the male external genitalia.

The testicles descend during prenatal development in a two-stage process that begins at eight weeks of gestation and continues through the middle of the third trimester. During the transabdominal stage (8 to 15 weeks of gestation), the gubernacular ligament contracts and begins to thicken. The craniosuspensory ligament begins to break down. This stage is regulated by the secretion of insulin-like 3 (INSL3), a relaxin-like factor produced by the testicles, and the INSL3 G-coupled receptor, LGR8. During the transinguinal phase (25 to 35 weeks of gestation), the testicles descend into the scrotum. This stage is regulated by androgens, the genitofemoral nerve, and calcitonin gene-related peptide. During the second and third trimester, testicular development concludes with the diminution of the fetal Leydig cells and the lengthening and coiling of the seminiferous cords.

==== Female gonadal development ====
For females, the ovaries become morphologically visible by the 8th week of gestation. The absence of testosterone results in the diminution of the Wolffian structures. The Müllerian structures remain and develop into the fallopian tubes, uterus, and the upper region of the vagina. The urogenital sinus develops into the urethra and lower region of the vagina, the genital tubercle develops into the clitoris, the urogenital folds develop into the labia minora, and the urogenital swellings develop into the labia majora. At 16 weeks of gestation, the ovaries produce FSH and LH/hCG receptors. At 20 weeks of gestation, the theca cell precursors are present and oogonia mitosis is occurring. At 25 weeks of gestation, the ovary is morphologically defined and folliculogenesis can begin.

Studies of gene expression show that a specific complement of genes, such as follistatin and multiple cyclin kinase inhibitors are involved in ovarian development. An assortment of genes and proteins - such as WNT4, RSPO1, FOXL2, and various estrogen receptors - have been shown to prevent the development of testicles or the lineage of male-type cells.

=== Pituitary gland ===
The pituitary gland is formed within the rostral neural plate. The Rathke's pouch, a cavity of ectodermal cells of the oropharynx, forms between the fourth and fifth week of gestation and upon full development, it gives rise to the anterior pituitary gland. By seven weeks of gestation, the anterior pituitary vascular system begins to develop. During the first 12 weeks of gestation, the anterior pituitary undergoes cellular differentiation. At 20 weeks of gestation, the hypophyseal portal system has developed. The Rathke's pouch grows towards the third ventricle and fuses with the diverticulum. This eliminates the lumen and the structure becomes Rathke's cleft. The posterior pituitary lobe is formed from the diverticulum. Portions of the pituitary tissue may remain in the nasopharyngeal midline. In rare cases this results in functioning ectopic hormone-secreting tumors in the nasopharynx.

The functional development of the anterior pituitary involves spatiotemporal regulation of transcription factors expressed in pituitary stem cells and dynamic gradients of local soluble factors. The coordination of the dorsal gradient of pituitary morphogenesis is dependent on neuroectodermal signals from the infundibular bone morphogenetic protein 4 (BMP4). This protein is responsible for the development of the initial invagination of the Rathke's pouch. Other essential proteins necessary for pituitary cell proliferation are Fibroblast growth factor 8 (FGF8), Wnt4, and Wnt5. Ventral developmental patterning and the expression of transcription factors is influenced by the gradients of BMP2 and sonic hedgehog protein (SHH). These factors are essential for coordinating early patterns of cell proliferation.

Six weeks into gestation, the corticotroph cells can be identified. By seven weeks of gestation, the anterior pituitary is capable of secreting ACTH. Within eight weeks of gestation, somatotroph cells begin to develop with cytoplasmic expression of human growth hormone. Once a fetus reaches 12 weeks of development, the thyrotrophs begin expression of Beta subunits for TSH, while gonadotrophs begin to express beta-subunits for LH and FSH. Male fetuses predominately produced LH-expressing gonadotrophs, while female fetuses produce an equal expression of LH and FSH expressing gonadotrophs. At 24 weeks of gestation, prolactin-expressing lactotrophs begin to emerge.

== Function ==
=== Hormones ===
A hormone is any of a class of signaling molecules produced by cells in glands in multicellular organisms that are transported by the circulatory system to target distant organs to regulate physiology and behaviour. Hormones have diverse chemical structures, mainly of 3 classes: eicosanoids, steroids, and amino acid/protein derivatives (amines, peptides, and proteins). The glands that secrete hormones comprise the endocrine system. The term hormone is sometimes extended to include chemicals produced by cells that affect the same cell (autocrine or intracrine signalling) or nearby cells (paracrine signalling).

Hormones are used to communicate between organs and tissues for physiological regulation and behavioral activities, such as digestion, metabolism, respiration, tissue function, sensory perception, sleep, excretion, lactation, stress, growth and development, movement, reproduction, and mood.

Hormones affect distant cells by binding to specific receptor proteins in the target cell resulting in a change in cell function. This may lead to cell type-specific responses that include rapid changes to the activity of existing proteins, or slower changes in the expression of target genes. Amino acid–based hormones (amines and peptide or protein hormones) are water-soluble and act on the surface of target cells via signal transduction pathways; steroid hormones, being lipid-soluble, move through the plasma membranes of target cells to act within their nuclei.

=== Cell signalling ===
The typical mode of cell signalling in the endocrine system is endocrine signaling, that is, using the circulatory system to reach distant target organs. However, there are also other modes, i.e., paracrine, autocrine, and neuroendocrine signaling. Purely neurocrine signaling between neurons, on the other hand, belongs completely to the nervous system.

==== Autocrine ====
Autocrine signaling is a form of signaling in which a cell secretes a hormone or chemical messenger (called the autocrine agent) that binds to autocrine receptors on the same cell, leading to changes in the cells.

==== Paracrine ====
Some endocrinologists and clinicians include the paracrine system as part of the endocrine system, but there is not consensus. Paracrines are slower acting, targeting cells in the same tissue or organ. An example of this is somatostatin which is released by some pancreatic cells and targets other pancreatic cells.

==== Juxtacrine ====
Juxtacrine signaling is a type of intercellular communication that is transmitted via oligosaccharide, lipid, or protein components of a cell membrane, and may affect either the emitting cell or the immediately adjacent cells.

It occurs between adjacent cells that possess broad patches of closely opposed plasma membrane linked by transmembrane channels known as connexons. The gap between the cells can usually be between only 2 and 4 nm.

== Clinical significance ==
=== Disease ===
Diseases of the endocrine system are common, including conditions such as diabetes mellitus, thyroid disease, and obesity. Endocrine disease is characterized by misregulated hormone release (a productive pituitary adenoma), inappropriate response to signaling (hypothyroidism), lack of a gland (diabetes mellitus type 1, diminished erythropoiesis in chronic kidney failure), or structural enlargement in a critical site such as the thyroid (toxic multinodular goitre). Hypofunction of endocrine glands can occur as a result of loss of reserve, hyposecretion, agenesis, atrophy, or active destruction. Hyperfunction can occur as a result of hypersecretion, loss of suppression, hyperplastic or neoplastic change, or hyperstimulation.

Endocrinopathies are classified as primary, secondary, or tertiary. Primary endocrine disease inhibits the action of downstream glands. Secondary endocrine disease is indicative of a problem with the pituitary gland. Tertiary endocrine disease is associated with dysfunction of the hypothalamus and its releasing hormones.

As the thyroid, and hormones have been implicated in signaling distant tissues to proliferate, for example, the estrogen receptor has been shown to be involved in certain breast cancers. Endocrine, paracrine, and autocrine signaling have all been implicated in proliferation, one of the required steps of oncogenesis.

Other common diseases that result from endocrine dysfunction include Addison's disease, Cushing's disease and Graves' disease. Cushing's disease and Addison's disease are pathologies involving the dysfunction of the adrenal gland. Dysfunction in the adrenal gland could be due to primary or secondary factors and can result in hypercortisolism or hypocortisolism. Cushing's disease is characterized by the hypersecretion of the adrenocorticotropic hormone (ACTH) due to a pituitary adenoma that ultimately causes endogenous hypercortisolism by stimulating the adrenal glands. Some clinical signs of Cushing's disease include obesity, moon face, and hirsutism. Addison's disease is an endocrine disease that results from hypocortisolism caused by adrenal gland insufficiency. Adrenal insufficiency is significant because it is correlated with decreased ability to maintain blood pressure and blood sugar, a defect that can prove to be fatal.

Graves' disease involves the hyperactivity of the thyroid gland which produces the T3 and T4 hormones. Graves' disease effects range from excess sweating, fatigue, heat intolerance and high blood pressure to swelling of the eyes that causes redness, puffiness and in rare cases reduced or double vision.

== DALY rates ==
Disability-adjusted life year for endocrine disorders per 100,000 inhabitants in 2002.

data not recorded
80>
80–160
160–240
240–320
320–400
400–480
480–560
560–640
640–720
720–800
800–1000
1000+

A DALY (Disability-Adjusted Life Year) is a measure that reflects the total burden of disease. It combines years of life lost (due to premature death) and years lived with disability (adjusted for the severity of the disability). The lower the DALY rates, the lower the burden of endocrine disorders in a country.

The map shows that large parts of Asia have lower DALY rates (pale yellow), suggesting that endocrine disorders have a relatively low impact on overall health, whereas some countries in South America and Africa (specifically Suriname and Somalia) have higher DALY rates (dark orange to red), indicating a higher disease burden from endocrine disorders.

== Other animals ==
A neuroendocrine system has been observed in all animals with a nervous system and all vertebrates have a hypothalamus–pituitary axis. All vertebrates have a thyroid, which in amphibians is also crucial for transformation of larvae into adult form. All vertebrates have adrenal gland tissue, with mammals unique in having it organized into layers. All vertebrates have some form of a renin–angiotensin axis, and all tetrapods have aldosterone as a primary mineralocorticoid.

== Additional images ==
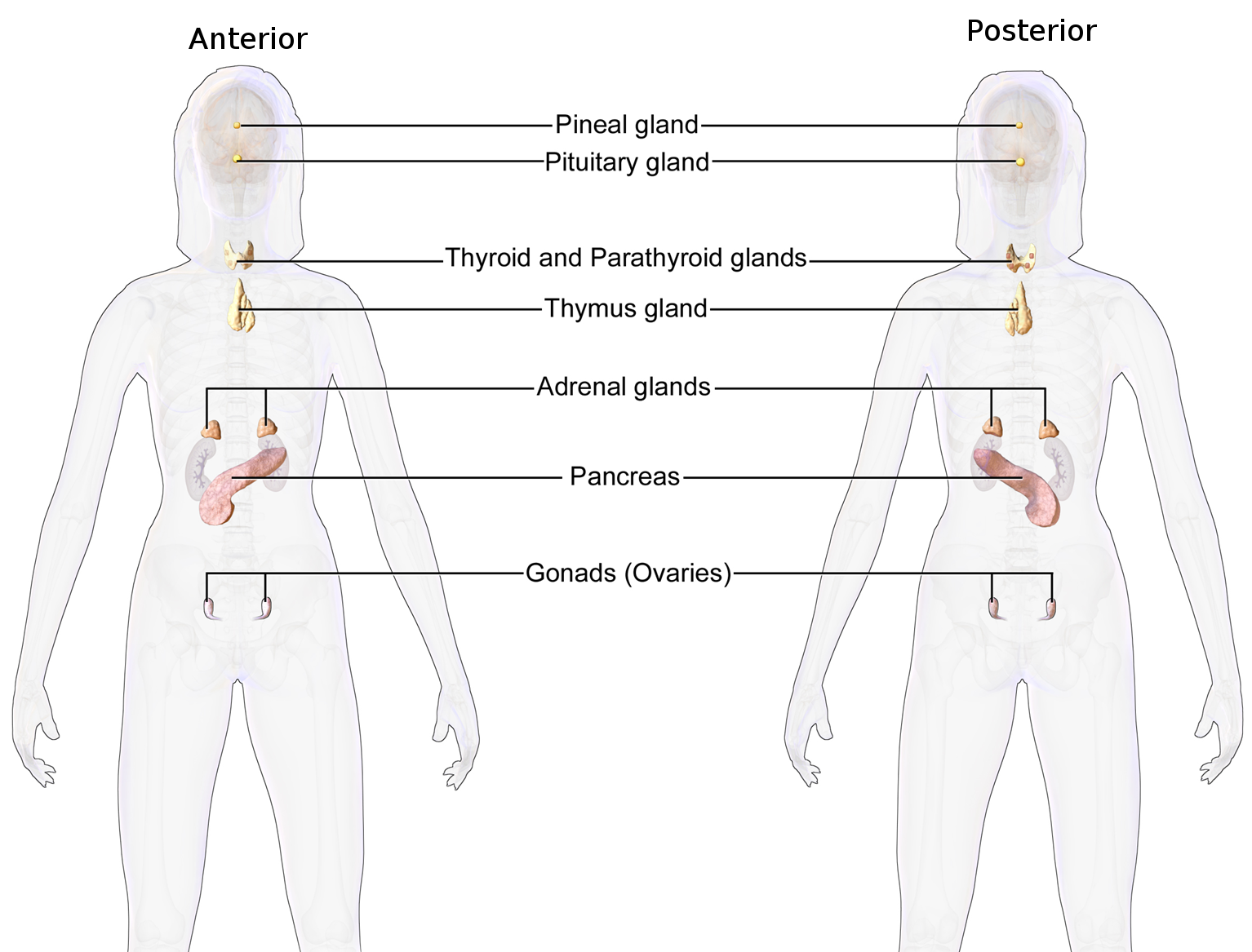
Female endocrine system

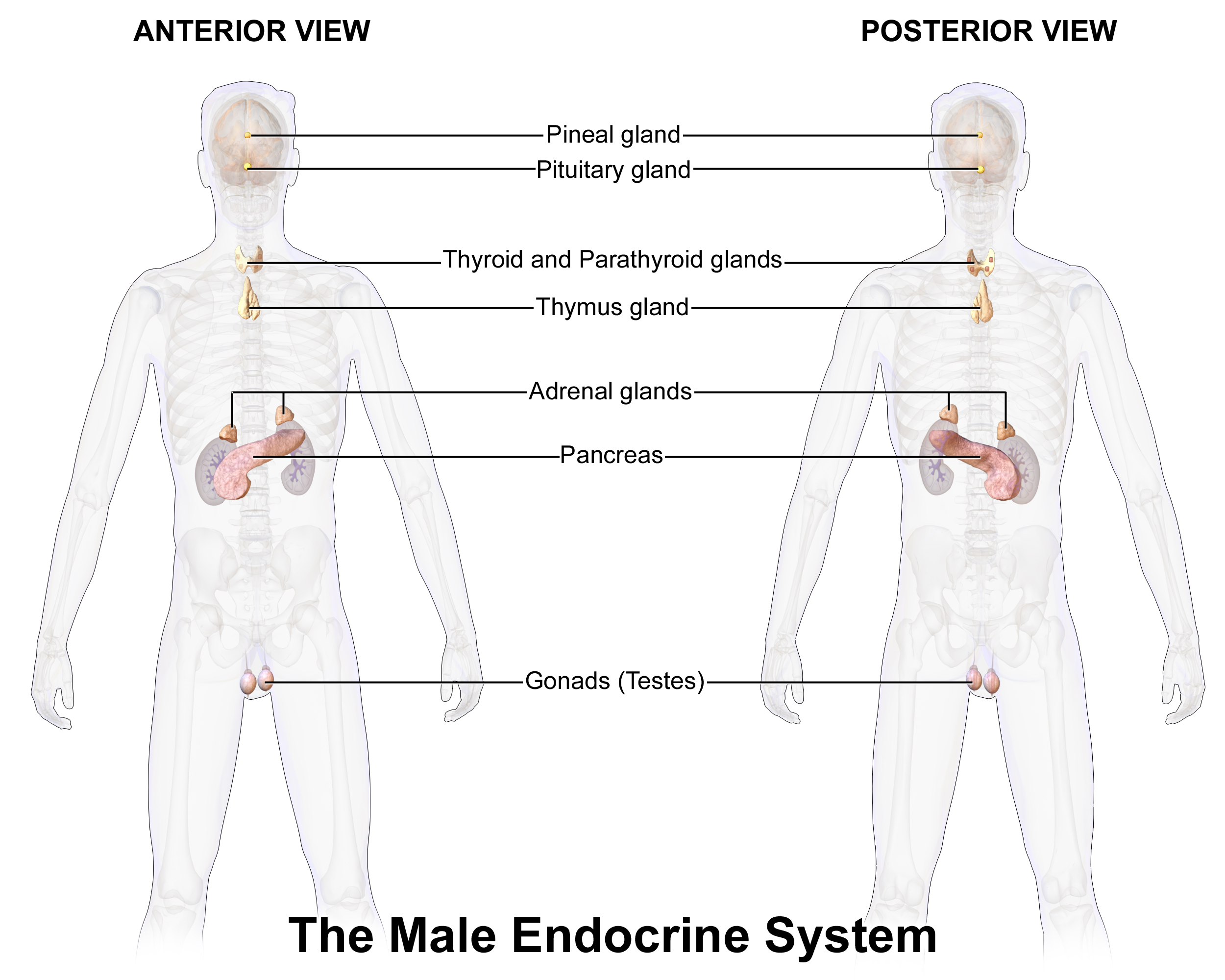
Male endocrine system

== See also ==
- Endocrine disease
- Endocrinology
- List of human endocrine organs and actions
- Neuroendocrinology
- Nervous system
- Paracrine signalling
- Releasing hormones
- Tropic hormone
