= Glucagon =

Peptide hormone

GCG

Identifiers
- Aliases: GCG, GLP1, glucagon, GRPP, GLP-1, GLP2
- External IDs: OMIM: 138030; MGI: 95674; GeneCards: GCG
Available structures
PDB	Ortholog search: PDBe RCSB
PDB	List of PDB id codes 1BH0, 1NAU, 2G49, 2M5P, 2M5Q,%%s4ZGM, 4APD, 3IOL, 1D0R,%%s2L64, 2L63

Gene location (Human)
Chr.	Chromosome 2 (human)
Band	2q24.2	Start	162,142,882 bp
Band	2q24.2	End	162,152,404 bp

Gene location (Mouse)
Chr.	Chromosome 2 (mouse)
Band	2 C1.3|2 35.85 cM	Start	62,304,874 bp
Band	2 C1.3|2 35.85 cM	End	62,313,994 bp
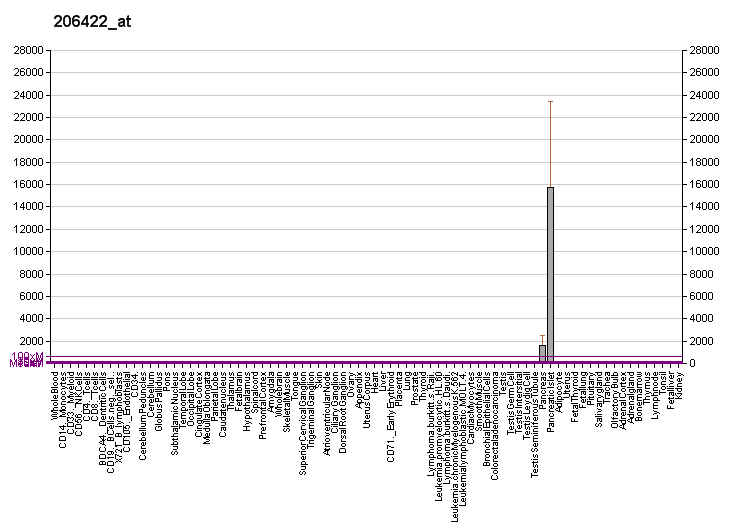
RNA expression pattern
Bgee	Human / Mouse (ortholog); Top expressed in: beta cell; body of pancreas; rectum; mucosa of sigmoid colon; mucosa of ileum; testicle; mucosa of transverse colon; epithelium of colon; jejunal mucosa; appendix / Top expressed in: islet of Langerhans; crypt of lieberkuhn of small intestine; ileum; large intestine; colon; lens; Paneth cell; left colon; jejunum; epithelium of small intestine; More reference expression data
BioGPS	More reference expression data
Gene ontology
Molecular function	protein binding; identical protein binding; hormone activity; glucagon receptor binding; signaling receptor binding
Cellular component	cytoplasm; endoplasmic reticulum lumen; extracellular region; secretory granule lumen; extracellular space
Biological process	negative regulation of execution phase of apoptosis; G protein-coupled receptor signaling pathway; regulation of insulin secretion; cellular response to glucagon stimulus; positive regulation of peptidyl-serine phosphorylation; positive regulation of calcium ion import; positive regulation of histone H3-K4 methylation; positive regulation of peptidyl-threonine phosphorylation; feeding behavior; positive regulation of ERK1 and ERK2 cascade; positive regulation of protein binding; cell population proliferation; signal transduction; positive regulation of protein kinase activity; adenylate cyclase-modulating G protein-coupled receptor signaling pathway; protein kinase A signaling; positive regulation of insulin secretion involved in cellular response to glucose stimulus; response to starvation; negative regulation of apoptotic process; regulation of signaling receptor activity; adenylate cyclase-activating G protein-coupled receptor signaling pathway
Sources:Amigo / QuickGO
Orthologs
Databases	NCBI: entry; OMA: entry
Species	Human	Mouse
Entrez	2641	14526
Ensembl	ENSG00000115263	ENSMUSG00000000394
UniProt	P01275	P55095
RefSeq (mRNA)	NM_002054	NM_008100
RefSeq (protein)	NP_002045	NP_032126
Location (UCSC)	Chr 2: 162.14 – 162.15 Mb	Chr 2: 62.3 – 62.31 Mb
PubMed search
- Wikidata
View/Edit Human	View/Edit Mouse

Glucagon is a peptide hormone, produced by alpha cells of the pancreas. It raises the concentration of glucose and fatty acids in the bloodstream and is considered to be the main catabolic hormone of the body. It is also used as a medication to treat a number of health conditions. Its effect is opposite to that of insulin, which lowers extracellular glucose. It is produced from proglucagon, encoded by the GCG gene.

The pancreas releases glucagon when the amount of glucose in the bloodstream is too low. Glucagon causes the liver to engage in glycogenolysis: converting stored glycogen into glucose, which is released into the bloodstream. High blood-glucose levels, on the other hand, stimulate the release of insulin. Insulin allows glucose to be taken up and used by insulin-dependent tissues. Thus, glucagon and insulin are part of a feedback system that keeps blood glucose levels stable. Glucagon increases energy expenditure and is elevated under conditions of stress. Glucagon belongs to the secretin family of hormones.

== Structure ==
Glucagon is a 29-amino acid polypeptide. Its primary structure in humans is: NH_{2}-His-Ser-Gln-Gly-Thr-Phe-Thr-Ser-Asp-Tyr-Ser-Lys-Tyr-Leu-Asp-Ser-Arg-Arg-Ala-Gln-Asp-Phe-Val-Gln-Trp-Leu-Met-Asn-Thr-COOH (HSQGTFTSDYSKYLDSRRAQDFVQWLMNT).

The polypeptide has a molecular mass of 3485 daltons. Glucagon is a peptide (nonsteroid) hormone.

== Physiology ==
=== Production ===
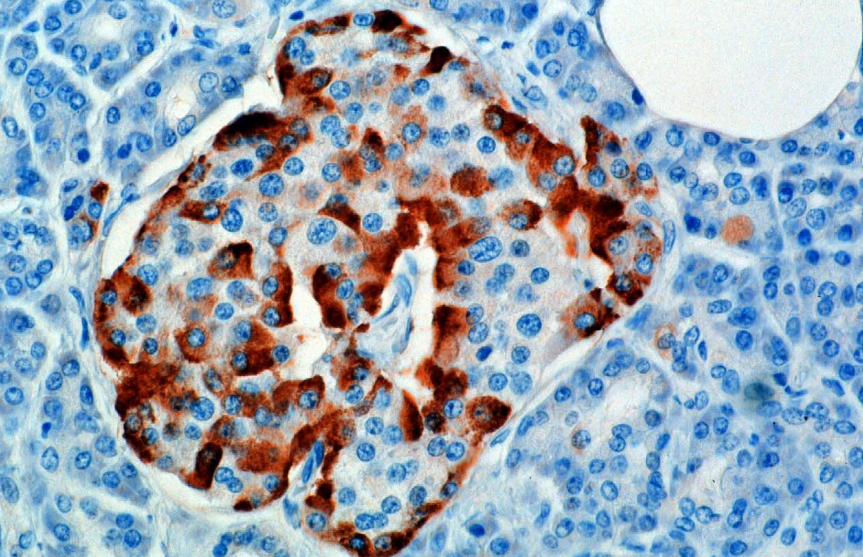
A microscopic image stained for glucagon

The hormone is synthesized and secreted from alpha cells (α-cells) of the islets of Langerhans, which are located in the endocrine portion of the pancreas. Glucagon is produced from the preproglucagon gene Gcg. Preproglucagon first has its signal peptide removed by signal peptidase, forming the 160-amino acid protein proglucagon. Proglucagon is then cleaved by proprotein convertase 2 to glucagon (amino acids 33-61) in pancreatic islet α cells. In intestinal L cells, proglucagon is cleaved to the alternate products glicentin (1–69), glicentin-related pancreatic polypeptide (1–30), oxyntomodulin (33–69), glucagon-like peptide 1 (72–107 or 108), and glucagon-like peptide 2 (126–158).

In rodents, the alpha cells are located in the outer rim of the islet. Human islet structure is much less segregated, and alpha cells are distributed throughout the islet in close proximity to beta cells. Glucagon is also produced by alpha cells in the stomach.

Recent research has demonstrated that glucagon production may also take place outside the pancreas, with the gut being the most likely site of extrapancreatic glucagon synthesis.

=== Regulation ===
Production, which is otherwise freerunning, is suppressed/regulated by amylin, a peptide hormone co-secreted with insulin from the pancreatic β cells. As plasma glucose levels recede, the subsequent reduction in amylin secretion alleviates its suppression of the α cells, allowing for glucagon secretion.

Secretion of glucagon is stimulated by:

- Hypoglycemia
- Epinephrine (via β2, α2, and α1 adrenergic receptors)
- Arginine
- Alanine (often from muscle-derived pyruvate/glutamate transamination (see alanine transaminase reaction).
- Acetylcholine
- Cholecystokinin
- Gastric inhibitory polypeptide
- Gastrin

Secretion of glucagon is inhibited by:

- Somatostatin
- Amylin
- Insulin (via GABA)
- PPARγ/retinoid X receptor heterodimer.
- Increased free fatty acids and keto acids into the blood.
- Increased urea production
- Glucagon-like peptide-1

== Function ==
Glucagon generally elevates the concentration of glucose in the blood by promoting gluconeogenesis and glycogenolysis. Glucagon also decreases fatty acid synthesis in adipose tissue and the liver, as well as promoting lipolysis in these tissues, which causes them to release fatty acids into circulation where they can be catabolised to generate energy in tissues such as skeletal muscle when required.

Glucose is stored in the liver in the form of the polysaccharide glycogen, which is a glucan (a polymer made up of glucose molecules). Liver cells (hepatocytes) have glucagon receptors. When glucagon binds to the glucagon receptors, the liver cells convert the glycogen into individual glucose molecules and release them into the bloodstream, in a process known as glycogenolysis. As these stores become depleted, glucagon then encourages the liver and kidney to synthesize additional glucose by gluconeogenesis. Glucagon turns off glycolysis in the liver, causing glycolytic intermediates to be shuttled to gluconeogenesis.

Glucagon also regulates the rate of glucose production through lipolysis. Glucagon induces lipolysis in humans under conditions of insulin suppression (such as diabetes mellitus type 1).

Glucagon production appears to be dependent on the central nervous system through pathways yet to be defined. In invertebrate animals, eyestalk removal has been reported to affect glucagon production. Excising the eyestalk in young crayfish produces glucagon-induced hyperglycemia.

== Mechanism of action ==
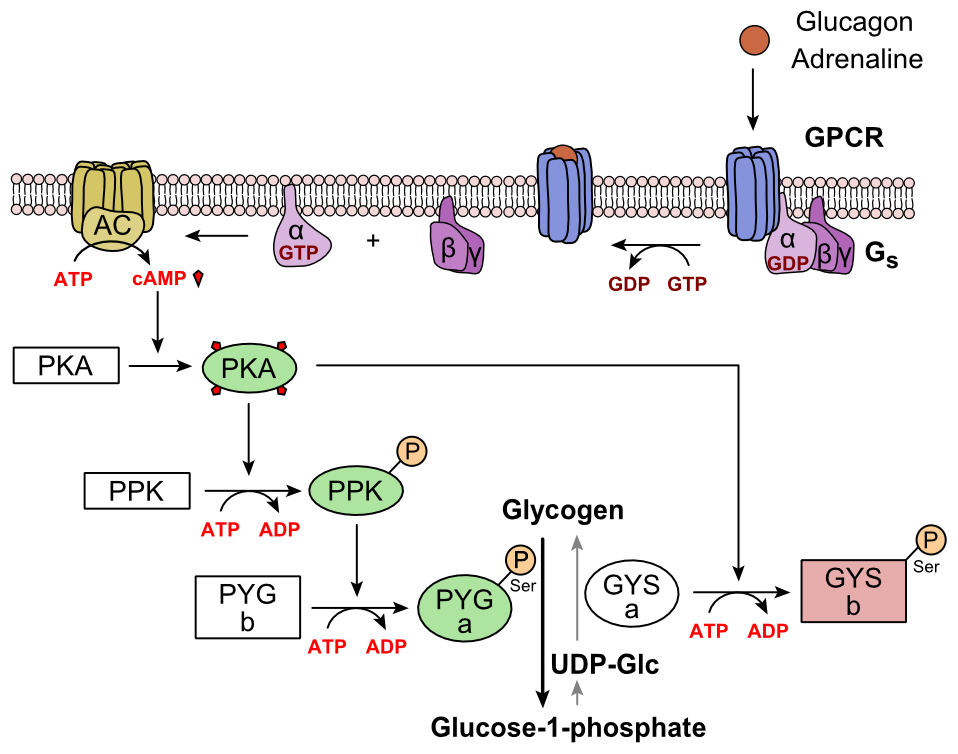
Metabolic regulation of glycogen by glucagon.

Glucagon binds to the glucagon receptor, a G protein-coupled receptor, located in the plasma membrane of the cell. The conformation change in the receptor activates a G protein, a heterotrimeric protein with α_{s}, β, and γ subunits. When the G protein interacts with the receptor, it undergoes a conformational change that results in the replacement of the GDP molecule that was bound to the α subunit with a GTP molecule. This substitution results in the releasing of the α subunit from the β and γ subunits. The alpha subunit specifically activates the next enzyme in the cascade, adenylate cyclase.

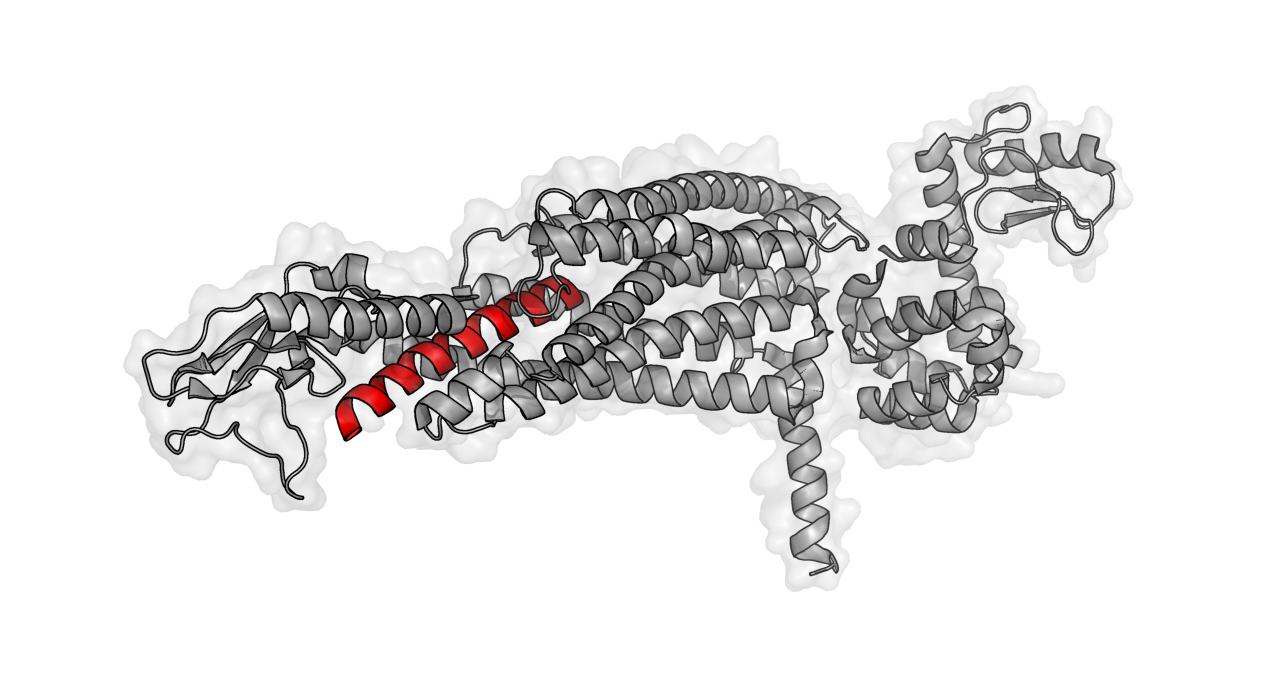
Glucagon (in red) bound to glucagon receptor

Adenylate cyclase manufactures cyclic adenosine monophosphate (cyclic AMP or cAMP), which activates protein kinase A (cAMP-dependent protein kinase). This enzyme, in turn, activates phosphorylase kinase, which then phosphorylates glycogen phosphorylase b (PYG b), converting it into the active form called phosphorylase a (PYG a). Phosphorylase a is the enzyme responsible for the release of glucose 1-phosphate from glycogen polymers. An example of the pathway would be when glucagon binds to a transmembrane protein. The transmembrane proteins interacts with Gɑβ𝛾. Gαs separates from Gβ𝛾 and interacts with the transmembrane protein adenylyl cyclase. Adenylyl cyclase catalyzes the conversion of ATP to cAMP. cAMP binds to protein kinase A, and the complex phosphorylates glycogen phosphorylase kinase. Phosphorylated glycogen phosphorylase kinase phosphorylates glycogen phosphorylase. Phosphorylated glycogen phosphorylase clips glucose units from glycogen as glucose 1-phosphate.

Additionally, the coordinated control of glycolysis and gluconeogenesis in the liver is adjusted by the phosphorylation state of the enzymes that catalyze the formation of a potent activator of glycolysis called fructose 2,6-bisphosphate. The enzyme protein kinase A (PKA) that was stimulated by the cascade initiated by glucagon will also phosphorylate a single serine residue of the bifunctional polypeptide chain containing both the enzymes fructose 2,6-bisphosphatase and phosphofructokinase-2. This covalent phosphorylation initiated by glucagon activates the former and inhibits the latter. This regulates the reaction catalyzing fructose 2,6-bisphosphate (a potent activator of phosphofructokinase-1, the enzyme that is the primary regulatory step of glycolysis) by slowing the rate of its formation, thereby inhibiting the flux of the glycolysis pathway and allowing gluconeogenesis to predominate. This process is reversible in the absence of glucagon (and thus, the presence of insulin).

Glucagon stimulation of PKA inactivates the glycolytic enzyme pyruvate kinase, inactivates glycogen synthase, and activates hormone-sensitive lipase, which catabolizes glycerides into glycerol and free fatty acid(s), in hepatocytes.

Glucagon also inactivates acetyl-CoA carboxylase (ACC), which creates malonyl-CoA from acetyl-CoA, through cAMP-dependent and/or cAMP-independent kinases.

Malonyl-CoA is a product formed by ACC during denovo synthesis and an allosteric inhibitor of carnitine palmitoyltransferase I (CPT1), a mitochondrial enzyme important for bringing fatty acids into the intermembrane space of the mitochondria for β-oxidation. Glucagon decreases malonyl-CoA through inhibition of acetyl-CoA carboxylase and through reduced glycolysis through its aforementioned reduction in Fructose 2,6-bisphosphate. Thus, reduction in malonyl-CoA is a common regulator for the increased fatty acid metabolism effects of glucagon.

== Pathology ==
Abnormally elevated levels of glucagon may be caused by pancreatic tumors, such as glucagonoma, symptoms of which include necrolytic migratory erythema, reduced amino acids, and hyperglycemia. It may occur alone or in the context of multiple endocrine neoplasia type 1.

Elevated glucagon is the main contributor to hyperglycemic ketoacidosis in undiagnosed or poorly treated type 1 diabetes. As the beta cells cease to function, insulin and pancreatic GABA are no longer present to suppress the freerunning output of glucagon. As a result, glucagon is released from the alpha cells at a maximum, causing a rapid breakdown of glycogen to glucose and fast ketogenesis. It was found that a subset of adults with type 1 diabetes took 8 hours longer on average (18 hours vs 10 hours) to approach ketoacidosis when given somatostatin (inhibits glucagon production) with no insulin. Inhibiting glucagon has been a popular idea of diabetes treatment, however, some have warned that doing so will give rise to brittle diabetes in patients with adequately stable blood glucose.

The absence of alpha cells (and hence glucagon) is thought to be one of the main influences in the extreme volatility of blood glucose in the setting of a total pancreatectomy.

== History ==
In the early 1920s, several groups noted that pancreatic extracts injected into diabetic animals would result in a brief increase in blood sugar prior to the insulin-driven decrease in blood sugar. In 1922, C. Kimball and John R. Murlin identified a component of pancreatic extracts responsible for this blood sugar increase, terming it "glucagon", a portmanteau of "glucose agonist". In the 1950s, scientists at Eli Lilly isolated pure glucagon, crystallized it, and determined its amino acid sequence. This led to the development of the first radioimmunoassay for detecting glucagon, described by Roger Unger's group in 1959.

A more complete understanding of its role in physiology and disease was not established until the 1970s, when a specific radioimmunoassay was developed.

In 1979, while working in Joel Habener's laboratory at Massachusetts General Hospital, Richard Goodman collected islet cells from Brockman bodies of American anglerfish in order to investigate somatostatin. By splicing DNA from anglerfish islet cells into bacteria, Goodman was able to identify the gene which codes for somatostatin. P. Kay Lund joined the Habener lab and used Goodman's bacteria to search for the gene for glucagon. In 1982, Lund and Goodman published their discovery that the proglucagon gene codes for three distinct peptides: glucagon and two novel peptides. Graeme Bell at Chiron Corporation led a team which isolated the two latter peptides, which are now known as glucagon-like peptide-1 and glucagon-like peptide-2. This opened the door to the discovery of the glucagon-like peptide-1 receptor and then drugs which target that receptor, known as GLP-1 receptor agonists.

== See also ==
- Cortisol
- Diabetes mellitus
- Glucagon-like peptide-1
- Glucagon-like peptide-2
- Insulin
- Islets of Langerhans
- Pancreas
- Proglucagon
- Tyrosine kinase
