= Somatostatin inhibitor =

Class of pharmaceuticals

Structure of somatostatin

Somatostatin receptor antagonists (or somatostatin inhibitors) are a class of chemical compounds that work by imitating the structure of the neuropeptide somatostatin, which is an endogenous hormone found in the human body. The somatostatin receptors are G protein-coupled receptors. Somatostatin receptor subtypes in humans include sstr1, 2A, 2 B, 3, 4, and 5. While normally expressed in the gastrointestinal (GI) tract, pancreas, hypothalamus, and central nervous system (CNS), they are expressed in different types of tumours. The predominant subtype in cancer cells is the ssrt2 subtype, which is expressed in neuroblastomas, meningiomas, medulloblastomas, breast carcinomas, lymphomas, renal cell carcinomas, paragangliomas, small cell lung carcinomas, and hepatocellular carcinomas.

As a radiopharmaceutical compound that is selective for somatostatin receptors, there is research being done for these radiolabeled compounds to act as diagnostic tests in PET scans for neuroendocrine tumors and other tumors not previously targeted with radiolabeled somatostatin receptor agonists, and to act as radiopharmaceutical therapeutic compound, more specifically to conduct peptide radionuclide receptor therapy.

Some non-radiopharmaceutical compounds that are developed as competitive inhibitors of somatostatin, such as the hormone antagonist cyclosomatostatin.

== Somatostatin ==
Effects of somatostatin

Somatostatin is a G protein-coupled receptor ligand. When the receptors are activated, it causes the cells where the receptors are expressed to decrease hormone secretion. Mainly, as a neuroendocrine inhibitor, it exerts its effects on the gastrointestinal tract, pancreas, hypothalamus, and central nervous system, causing hormone secretions coupled to this pathway to be reduced. It can affect neurotransmission and memory formation within the central nervous system. Within human and animal models, it demonstrated its effects of preventing angiogenesis and reducing healthy and cancer cell proliferation.

Within tumors, somatostatin receptors, mostly of the ssrt2 subtype, are expressed in most neuroendocrine tumors, breast tumors, some brain tumors, renal tumors, lymphomas, and prostate tumors.

== Somatostatin receptor antagonists in radiolabelling ==
These compounds work by binding to somatostatin receptors, which are more common in specific types of tumours. It does not activate the receptor. Due to the radionuclide, it will appear on PET scans. The radiolabeled somatostatin receptor antagonists share the following structure. The antagonist has a peptide moiety, and is responsible for receptor recognition and antagonist activities. Nomenclature is based on Radionuclide-Chelator-Receptor Antagonist.

Structure of DOTA, also known as tetraxetan

Structure of NODAGA

The structure of somatostatin receptor antagonists is similar to that of the agonists. Some agonists were already approved by the FDA for clinical use, such as In-DTPA-octreotide and Ga-DOTATATE. Development started after the discovery of modifications that can be done to the octreotide group, an ssrt selective subtype agonist, to cause its agonistic effects to be lost and gain antagonistic effects. Different subtype receptor antagonists were later developed.

Research has been done mostly on the sstr2 receptor antagonist, as the sstr2 receptor is expressed on most tumors. Somatostatin receptor antagonists are divided by generation based on the type of the subtype receptor antagonist. The first generation consists of sst2-ANT and BASS, which are sstr2 selective; and sst3-ODAN-8, which is selective for sstr3.

After initial results of their increased sensitivity to neurocrine tumors appeared, ssrt2 selective antagonists that had even higher affinity were developed. These were LM3, JR10, and JR11, which make up the second generation. JR11 was shown to be the most effective among these 3 antagonists, and compounds that entered further clinical development to act as a PET imaging agent or therapeutic agent carried this subtype antagonist.

The presence of a chelator coupled to the subtype antagonist was shown to affect the biological properties., by increasing the binding stability of the radionuclide to the rest of the compound, and increasing the binding affinity to the receptor by allowing conjugation of the radionuclide to the receptor. Compounds were developed with 3 macrocyclic chelators: DOTA, NODAGA, and CB-TE2A. DOTA had already been used as a chelator in the radiolabeled somatostatin agonists, as well as NODAGA and CB-TE2A. Ga-NODAGA-based compounds were shown to have a higher binding affinity than its DOTA analogues. However, these somatostatin receptor antagonists showed a higher tumor uptake despite its lower affinity for ssrt receptors, due to being able to bind a receptor despite its activation status.

Compounds containing one of the radionuclides of indium-111, lutetium-177, copper-64, yttrium-80 and gallium-68 have been made. A study indicated the gallium compound had the lowest affinity to the sstr2 receptor.

=== List of radiolabeled somatostatin receptor antagonists ===
The following listed compounds are those that have entered some phase of a pre-clinical study.

Name	Status
Ga-DOTA-JR11 (Ga-OPS201)	Pilot Study
Ga-NODAGA-JR11 (Ga-OPS202)	Phase 1/2
Lu-DOTA-JR11 (Lu-OPS201)	Pilot Study
In-DOTA-BASS	Pilot Study
In-DOTA-JR11	Pilot Study

=== Structure of selected antagonist peptides ===
The structure of the antagonist peptides shown in the above table are shown below.

Name	Structure
JR11 (sactreotide)	p-Cl-Phe1-cyclo(d-Cys2-Aph3(Hor)-d-Aph4(Cbm)-Lys5-Thr6-Cys7)d-Tyr8-NH2
BASS	p-NO2-Phe1-cyclo(d-Cys2-Tyr3-d-Trp4-Lys5-Thr6-Cys7)d-Tyr8-NH2

=== Further clinical studies of radiolabeled somatostatin receptor antagonists ===
Ga-NODAGA-JR11 had entered further clinical studies as an imaging agent, while Lu-DOTA-JR11 had similar research done as a therapeutic agent, as JR11 has a high binding affinity for ssrt2 subtype receptors which are highly expressed on the surface of tumor cells. Gallium-containing agonists had already been established as an imaging agent. Lutetium-containing agonists were used as a therapeutic agent in peptide receptor radionuclide therapy, due to the lower energy electrons emitted, and γ-emission causing easier dose adjustment to patient characteristics to avoid renal damage. The NODAGA chelator was used over DOTA in Gallium antagonists due to higher binding affinity, while no Lu-NODAGA compounds were developed due to established usage of Lu-DOTA derivative agonist drugs, and poor uptake compared to DOTA, which is reverse that of the gallium-containing antagonists.

=== Safety of radiolabeled somatostatin receptor antagonists ===
In general, somatostatin receptor antagonists were noted to be well tolerated. However, due to its mechanism of action, it may decrease the effectiveness of SSA therapy (Somatostatin Analogue Therapy), but other studies indicate SSA may not need to be stopped if somatostatin antagonists are used to for tumor labelling instead of agonists. As somatostatin can cause inhibition of hormone production that uses it as a mediating hormone, it has an antiproliferative effect on cell tumors, especially in neuroendocrine tumors. Somatostatin analogue therapy uses longer-acting agonists than the endogenous somatostatin to extend the antiproliferative effects. Somatostatin receptor antagonists can bind to the receptors without activating them, antagonizing the therapeutic inhibitory effects of SSA therapy. Slow intravenous injection might be used until further safety data become available.

== Comparison of somatostatin receptor agonists and antagonists in radiolabelling ==
Agonists of the somatostatin receptor had been long established as an imaging agent, with the first agonist Ga-DOTATOC coming out in 2001, which is based on a radiolabeled somatostatin receptor agonist drug octreotide, and further developments were based on its structure. Agonists share the characteristic of being uptaken into tumor cells, and degraded intracellularly. Antagonists, while not widely absorbed into the tumor cells, can bind to a wider range of receptors as they can bind to the receptors regardless if the receptors are activated or inactivated. They thus are more sensitive to neuroendocrine tumors.

Another study noted the antagonists showed lowered internalization into tumors, cleared from the blood quickly, and had a higher binding to tumors, which were noted to be properties benefitting its use over agonists in detecting metastatic tumors.

A head-to-head study of the gallium-containing compounds, where the Ga-NODAGA-JR11 antagonist and Ga-DOTATOC agonist are directly compared, showed that Ga-NODAGA-JR11 had a higher hepatic metastatic tumor detection rate and lesion sensitivity than Ga-DOTATOC.

Another head-to-head study of lutetium containing compound found the antagonist Lu-DOTA-JR11 bound with the receptors more quickly, had a longer retention time, and unbound more slowly than the Lu-DOTA-TATE agonist.

== Radiolabeled somatostatin receptor antagonists in Peptide Radionuclide Receptor Therapy (PRRT) ==
Somatostatin receptor antagonists are also being developed as therapeutic agents in peptide radionuclide receptor therapy (PRRT) due to the wider binding of antagonists compared to agonists. Research indicated the antagonist Lu-DOTA-JR11 showed a higher tumor uptake, more double-strand breaks within tumor cells, longer adherence time to tumors and improved tumor-to-kidney dose ratio.

Moreover, another study finds out the radionuclide terbium-161, which can release short-ranged electrons, can combine with somatostatin receptor antagonists that localize at the cell membrane. acting as an alternative to the current clinically used lutetium-somatostatin receptor agonist, which are localized at the cytoplasm and nucleus. Moreover, Tb-antagonist in vitro shows 102-fold higher potency than Lu-antagonists in inhibiting tumor cell growth and survival prolongation in mice, due to its high linear energy transfer. This result is further repeated and confirmed in vivo, showing the high potential and strengths of radiolabeled somatostatin receptor antagonists to treat neuroendocrine neoplasms.

== Further potential ==
Structure of cyclosomatostatin

Other compounds other than radiolabelled somatostatin receptor antagonists have also been studied. Cyclosomatostatin is one such compound. Contrary to previously discussed compounds, cyclosomatostatin does not contain a radionuclide. It is a non-selective somatostatin receptor antagonist, inhibiting the effects of somatostatin on target cells in the gastrointestinal tract, pancreas, hypothalamus, and central nervous system. Cyclosomatostatin is used as a research chemical to investigate the effects of somatostatin on different cell types by antagonizing its receptors. However it acts as an agonist in SH-SY5Y neuroblastoma cells.

Cyclosomatostatin is also known by the following names:

- 7-CPP
- antagonist SRIF-A
- CyCam
- cyclo(7-Ahep-Phe-Trp-Lys-Thr(Bzl))
- cyclo(7-aminoheptanoylphenylalanyl-tryptophyl-lysyl-benzylthreonyl)
- cyclo-(7-aminoheptanoyl-Phe-D-Trp-Lys-Thr(Bzl))

Cyclosomatostatin may have the possibility of treating complications of acute hemorrhage. Hepatic insulin sensitizing substance (HISS), a hormone, will be secreted by the liver which stimulates skeletal muscle glucose uptake when responding to insulin. This action makes up around 56% of total insulin action. Hemorrhage was shown to cause insulin resistance by this type of HISS-dependent insulin resistance (HDIR). Two animal studies shows that cyclosomatostatin can help prevent HDIR without correcting the hyperglycemic condition in the situation of hemorrhage and exogenous somatostatin infusion.

Cyclosomatostatin may be related to other indications, including the potential of blocking the suppression of gastric emptying triggered by corticotropin-releasing hormone (CRH), the key regulator of the hypothalamic-pituitary-adrenal axis released to alter the body response caused by stress. Furthermore, cyclosomatostatin, even if used alone, may modulate neurotransmitter levels. It increases acetylcholine (ACh) release by reversing the inhibitory effect of a substance, DHP agonist Bay K 8844, to L-type voltage-sensitive Ca2+ calcium channel.
