= BIM-23027 =

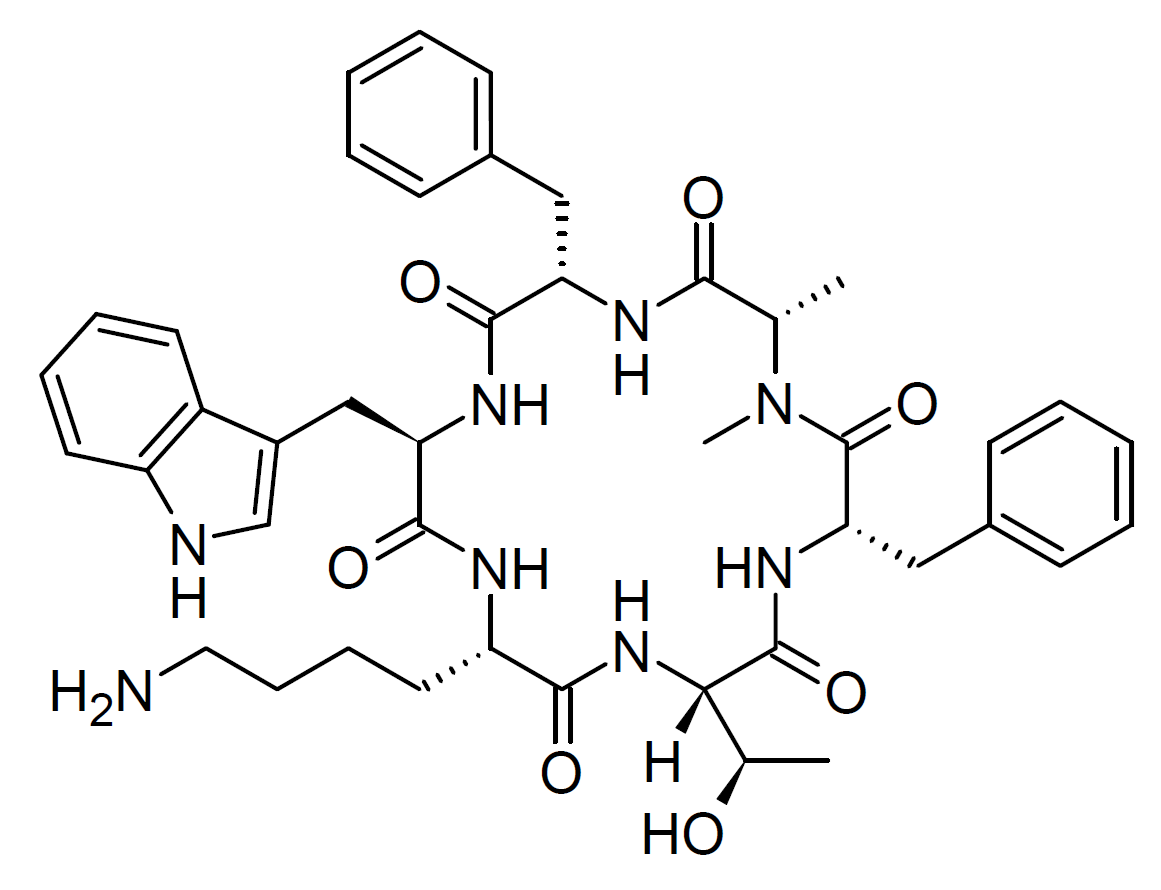

Identifiers
- IUPAC name: (3S,6S,9S,12R,15S,18S)-9-(4-aminobutyl)-3,15-dibenzyl-6-[(1R)-1-hydroxyethyl]-12-(1H-indol-3-ylmethyl)-1,18-dimethyl-1,4,7,10,13,16-hexazacyclooctadecane-2,5,8,11,14,17-hexone
- CAS Number: 78981-49-4
- PubChem CID: 12803358
- ChemSpider: 30845322
- ChEMBL: ChEMBL2371048

Chemical and physical data
- Formula: C_{43}H_{54}N_{8}O_{7}
- Molar mass: 794.954 g·mol^{−1}
- 3D model (JSmol): Interactive image
- SMILES: C[C@H]1C(=O)N[C@H](C(=O)N[C@@H](C(=O)N[C@H](C(=O)N[C@H](C(=O)N[C@H](C(=O)N1C)CC2=CC=CC=C2)[C@@H](C)O)CCCCN)CC3=CNC4=CC=CC=C43)CC5=CC=CC=C5
- InChI: InChI=1S/C43H54N8O7/c1-26-38(53)47-34(22-28-14-6-4-7-15-28)40(55)48-35(24-30-25-45-32-19-11-10-18-31(30)32)41(56)46-33(20-12-13-21-44)39(54)50-37(27(2)52)42(57)49-36(43(58)51(26)3)23-29-16-8-5-9-17-29/h4-11,14-19,25-27,33-37,45,52H,12-13,20-24,44H2,1-3H3,(H,46,56)(H,47,53)(H,48,55)(H,49,57)(H,50,54)/t26-,27+,33-,34-,35+,36-,37-/m0/s1; Key:XDLJZSJKUWEHIA-ZKVPYEFOSA-N

BIM-23027 is a cyclic hexapeptide which acts as a selective agonist at somatostatin receptor 2. It inhibits secretion of various hormones and increases dopamine release in brain tissue, however due to poor pharmacokinetic properties its use has mainly been restricted to basic research into the function of SSRT2 receptors and distinguishing their action from other somatostatin receptor subtypes.

== See also ==
- Octreotide
