= Paltusotine =

Chemical compound

- Molecular structure of paltusotine

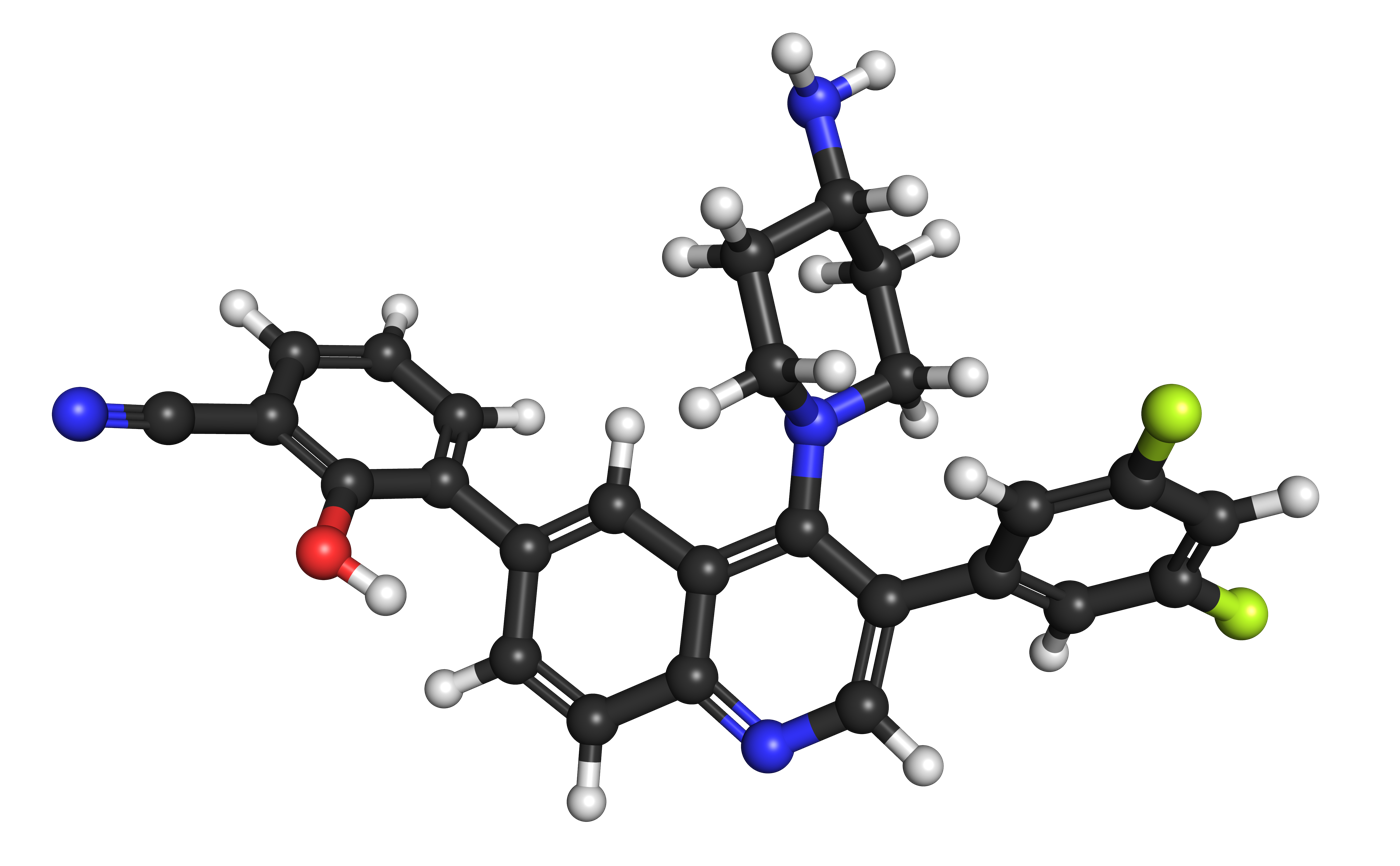
- 3D representation of a paltusotine molecule

Clinical data
- Trade names: Palsonify
- AHFS/Drugs.com: Multum Consumer Information
- MedlinePlus: a625106
- License data: US DailyMed: Paltusotine
- Routes of administration: By mouth
- Drug class: Somatostatin receptor agonist
- ATC code: H01CB06 (WHO)

Legal status
- Legal status: US: ℞-only; EU: Rx-only

Identifiers
- IUPAC name: 3-[4-(4-Amino-1-piperidinyl)-3-(3,5-difluorophenyl)-6-quinolinyl]-2-hydroxybenzonitrile
- CAS Number: 2172870-89-0; as HCl: 2361216-83-1
- PubChem CID: 134168328
- DrugBank: DB16277
- ChemSpider: 81367268
- UNII: F2IBD1GMD3; as HCl: FZT5Z83JNS
- KEGG: D12477; as HCl: D12478
- PDB ligand: IUD (PDBe, RCSB PDB)

Chemical and physical data
- Formula: C_{27}H_{22}F_{2}N_{4}O
- Molar mass: 456.497 g·mol^{−1}
- 3D model (JSmol): Interactive image
- SMILES: C1CN(CCC1N)C2=C3C=C(C=CC3=NC=C2C4=CC(=CC(=C4)F)F)C5=CC=CC(=C5O)C#N
- InChI: InChI=1S/C27H22F2N4O/c28-19-10-18(11-20(29)13-19)24-15-32-25-5-4-16(22-3-1-2-17(14-30)27(22)34)12-23(25)26(24)33-8-6-21(31)7-9-33/h1-5,10-13,15,21,34H,6-9,31H2; Key:GHILNKWBALQPDP-UHFFFAOYSA-N; Key:BPVXAUKYSITSMT-UHFFFAOYSA-N

Paltusotine, sold under the brand name Palsonify, is a medication used for the treatment of acromegaly. It is a somatostatin receptor 2 agonist. It is taken by mouth. It was developed by Crinetics Pharmaceuticals.

The most common side effects include diarrhea, abdominal pain, nausea, decreased appetite, bradycardia, hyperglycemia, and gastroenteritis (stomach inflammation).

Paltusotine was approved for medical use in the United States in September 2025.

== Medical uses ==
Paltusotine is indicated for the treatment of adults with acromegaly who had an inadequate response to surgery and/or for whom surgery is not an option.

Acromegaly is a rare endocrine disorder that causes some bones, organs, and other tissue to grow bigger. The pituitary gland in the brain causes these changes by making too much growth hormone due to the presence of a non-cancerous tumor.

== Adverse effects ==
Paltusotine increases the risk of cholelithiasis (gallstones); hyperglycemia (high blood sugar); hypoglycemia (low blood sugar); bradycardia (low heart rate); thyroid function abnormalities; steatorrhea (excessive fat in the stool) and malabsorption of dietary fats; and changes in vitamin B12 levels.

The most common side effects are diarrhea, abdominal pain, nausea, decreased appetite, bradycardia, hyperglycemia, and gastroenteritis (stomach inflammation).

== History ==
The safety and efficacy of paltusotine were evaluated in two randomized, double-blind, placebo-controlled, phase III studies.

In study 1, 111 adults with acromegaly received paltusotine or placebo. The primary endpoint was the proportion of participants achieving biochemical control (defined as insulin-like growth factor [IGF-1] and GH levels within the normal range). At 24 weeks, 56% of participants who received paltusotine had achieved biochemical control compared to 5% of participants who had received placebo.

In study 2, 58 adults with acromegaly who were previously treated with and responded to other medical therapy received paltusotine or placebo. At 36 weeks, 83% of participants switching to paltusotine in study 2 maintained biochemical control compared to 4% of participants receiving placebo.

== Society and culture ==
=== Legal status ===
Paltusotine was approved for medical use in the United States in September 2025.

=== Names ===
Paltusotine is the international nonproprietary name.

Paltusotine is sold under the brand name Palsonify.
