= Somatostatin receptor 3 =

Protein-coding gene in the species Homo sapiens

SSTR3

Identifiers
- Aliases: SSTR3, SS-3-R, SS3-R, SS3R, SSR-28, Somatostatin receptor 3
- External IDs: OMIM: 182453; MGI: 98329; GeneCards: SSTR3

Gene location (Human)
Chr.	Chromosome 22 (human)
Band	22q13.1	Start	37,204,237 bp
Band	22q13.1	End	37,212,477 bp

Gene location (Mouse)
Chr.	Chromosome 15 (mouse)
Band	15 E1|15 37.55 cM	Start	78,421,208 bp
Band	15 E1|15 37.55 cM	End	78,428,885 bp
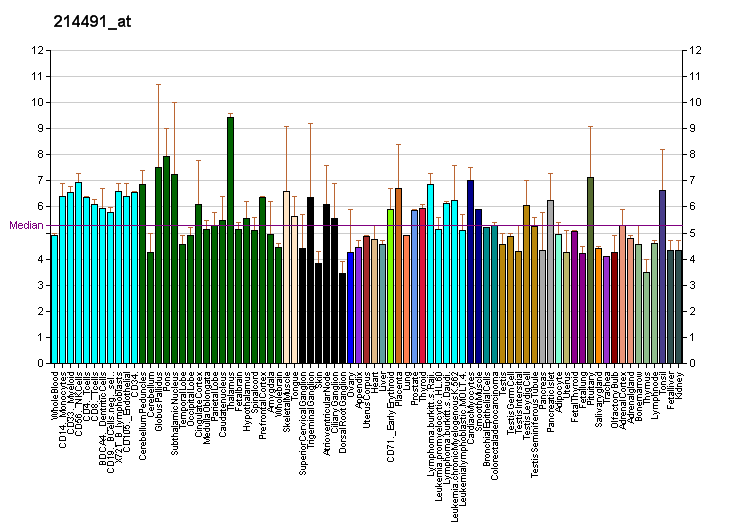
RNA expression pattern
Bgee	Human / Mouse (ortholog); Top expressed in: buccal mucosa cell; islet of Langerhans; prefrontal cortex; right frontal lobe; dorsolateral prefrontal cortex; Brodmann area 9; occipital lobe; primary visual cortex; right testis; left testis / Top expressed in: islet of Langerhans; lumbar subsegment of spinal cord; dentate gyrus of hippocampal formation granule cell; subdivision of hippocampus; primary motor cortex; Region I of hippocampus proper; primary visual cortex; hippocampus proper; superior frontal gyrus; prefrontal cortex; More reference expression data
BioGPS	More reference expression data
Gene ontology
Molecular function	neuropeptide binding; signal transducer activity; protein binding; somatostatin receptor activity; signaling receptor binding; G protein-coupled receptor activity; peptide binding
Cellular component	cytoplasm; integral component of membrane; membrane; integral component of plasma membrane; cilium; neuron projection; plasma membrane; ciliary membrane; non-motile cilium
Biological process	cell-cell signaling; G protein-coupled receptor signaling pathway, coupled to cyclic nucleotide second messenger; cellular response to estradiol stimulus; cerebellum development; cellular response to glucocorticoid stimulus; spermatogenesis; response to starvation; hormone-mediated apoptotic signaling pathway; forebrain development; signal transduction; negative regulation of cell population proliferation; chemical synaptic transmission; somatostatin signaling pathway; neuropeptide signaling pathway; G protein-coupled receptor signaling pathway
Sources:Amigo / QuickGO
Orthologs
Databases	NCBI: entry; OMA: entry
Species	Human	Mouse
Entrez	6753	20607
Ensembl	ENSG00000278195	ENSMUSG00000044933
UniProt	P32745	P30935
RefSeq (mRNA)	NM_001051; NM_001278687	NM_009218; NM_001356961
RefSeq (protein)	NP_001042; NP_001265616	NP_033244; NP_001343890
Location (UCSC)	Chr 22: 37.2 – 37.21 Mb	Chr 15: 78.42 – 78.43 Mb
PubMed search
- Wikidata
View/Edit Human	View/Edit Mouse

Somatostatin receptor type 3 is a protein that in humans is encoded by the SSTR3 gene.

== Function ==
Somatostatin acts at many sites to inhibit the release of many hormones and other secretory proteins. The biological effects of somatostatin are probably mediated by a family of G protein-coupled receptors that are expressed in a tissue-specific manner. SSTR3 is a member of the superfamily of receptors having seven transmembrane segments and is expressed in highest levels in brain and pancreatic islets. SSTR3 is functionally coupled to adenylyl cyclase.

== Ligands ==
Agonists

- L-796778

Antagonists

- BN-81674
- MK-1421
- MK-4256

== See also ==
- Somatostatin receptor
