= Peptide receptor radionuclide therapy =

Type of radiotherapy

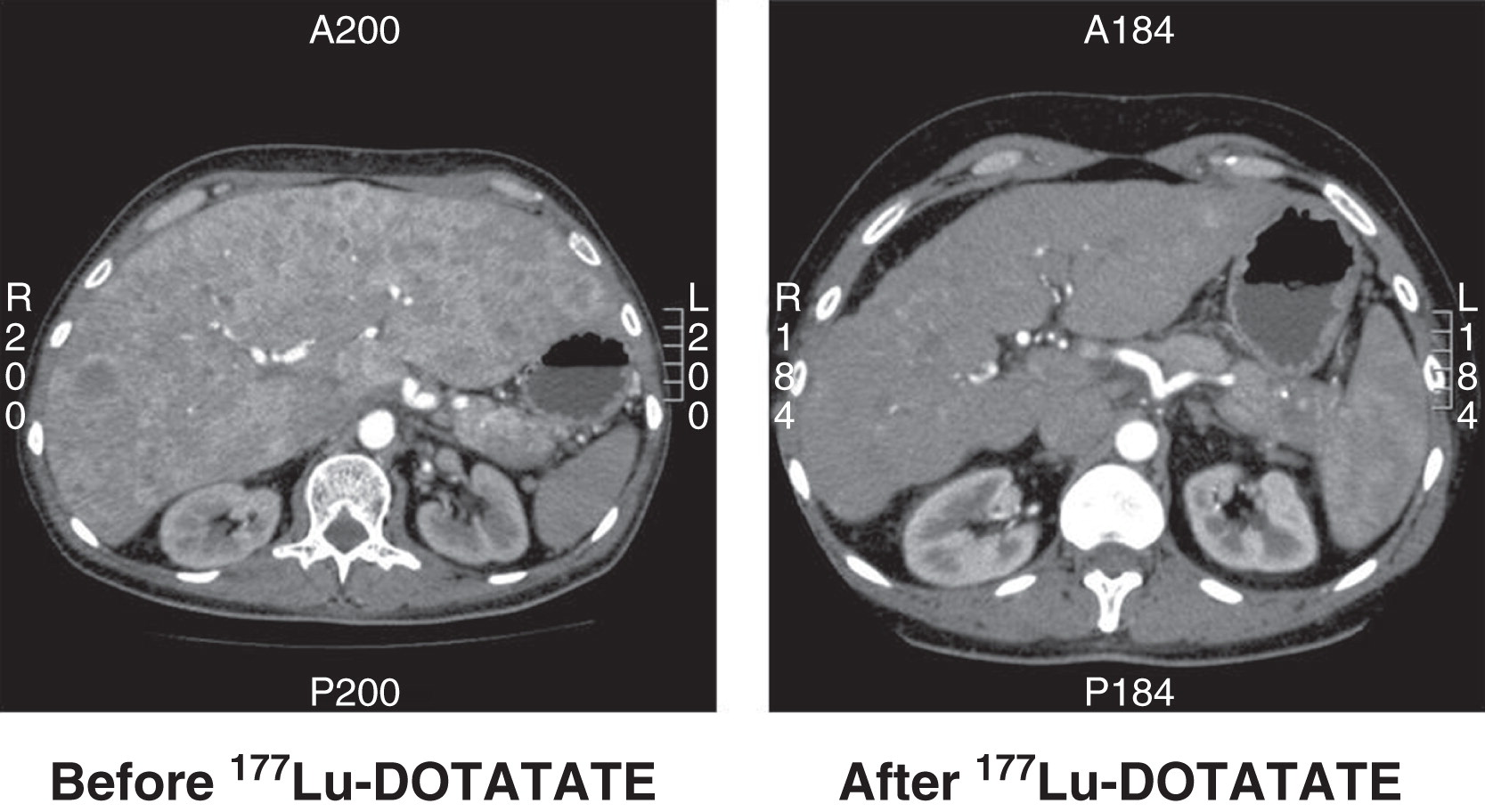
- CT scan of non-functioning pancreatic NET before and 6 months after successful treatment with four cycles of ^{177}Lu-DOTATATE.
- Specialty: Oncology

Peptide receptor radionuclide therapy (PRRT) is a type of radionuclide therapy, using a radiopharmaceutical that targets peptide receptors to deliver localised treatment, typically for neuroendocrine tumours (NETs).

== Mechanism ==
A key advantage of PRRT over other methods of radiotherapy is the ability to target delivery of therapeutic radionuclides directly to the tumour or target site. This works because some tumours have an abundance (overexpression) of peptide receptors, compared to normal tissue. A radioactive substance can be combined with a relevant peptide (or its analogue) so that it preferentially binds to the tumour. With a gamma emitter as the radionuclide, the technique can be used for imaging with a gamma camera or PET scanner to locate tumours. When paired with alpha or beta emitters, therapy can be achieved, as in PRRT.

The current generation of PRRT targets somatostatin receptors, with a range of analogue materials such as octreotide and other DOTA compounds. These are combined with indium-111, lutetium-177 or yttrium-90 for treatment. ^{111}In is primarily used for imaging alone, however in addition to its gamma emission there are also Auger electrons emitted, which can have a therapeutic effect in high doses.

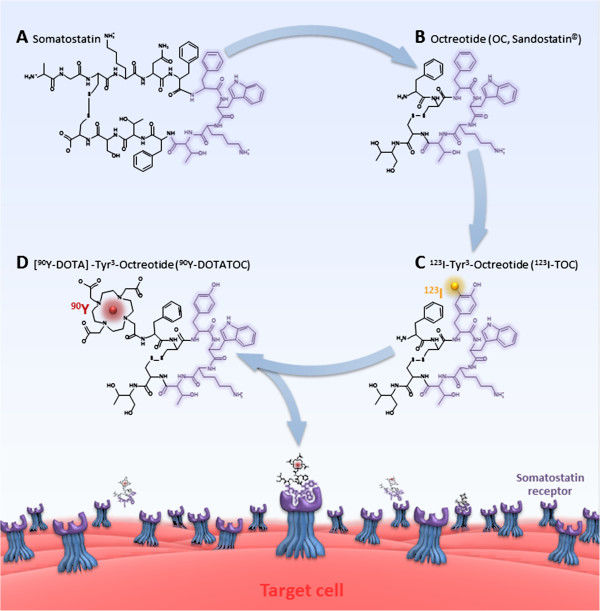
^{90}Y is bound with DOTATOC for PRRT treatments. The natural somatostatin receptor ligand, the 14 amino acid peptide somatostatin (A), was abridged to the biologically more stable 8 amino acid peptide Octreotide (OC, B). Introduction of a tyrosine into the 3rd position of the Octreotide sequence resulted in Tyr3-Octreotide (TOC, C), which allows for iodination of the tyrosine residue with the γ-emitter ^{123}I and subsequent somatostatin receptor targeted imaging. For the use in PRRT TOC was coupled with the chelator DOTA, to form the octapeptide DOTA-TOC (D).

PRRT radiopharmaceuticals are constructed with three components; the radionuclide, chelator, and somatostatin analogue (peptide). The radionuclide delivers the actual therapeutic effect (or emission, such as photons, for imaging). The chelator is the essential link between the radionuclide and peptide. For ^{177}Lu and ^{90}Y this is typically DOTA (tetracarboxylic acid, and its variants) and DTPA (pentetic acid) for ^{111}In. Other chelators known as NOTA (triazacyclononane triacetic acid) and HYNIC (hydrazinonicotinamide) have also been experimented with, albeit more for imaging applications. The somatostatin analogue affects biodistribution of the radionuclide, and therefore how effectively any treatment effect can be targeted. Changes affect which somatostatin receptor is most strongly targeted. For example, DOTA-lanreotide (DOTALAN) has a lower affinity for receptor 2 and a higher affinity for receptor 5 compared to DOTA-octreotide (DOTATOC).

== Applications ==
The body of research on the effectiveness of current PRRT is promising, but limited. Complete or partial treatment response has been seen in 20-30% of patients in trials treated with ^{177}Lu-DOTATATE or ^{90}Y-DOTATOC, among the most widely used PRRT drugs. When it comes to comparing these two PRRT, Y-labeled and Lu-labeled PRRTs, it appears that Y-labeled is more effective for larger tumors, while Lu-labeled is better for smaller and primary tumors. The lack of γ-emission with Y-labeled PPRTs is also an important difference between Lu peptides and Y peptide. In particular, with Y-labeled PRRT it becomes difficult to set up a dose of radiations specific to the patient's needs. In most cases PRRT is used for cancers of the gastroenteropancreatic and bronchial tracts, and in some cases phaeochromocytoma, paraganglioma, neuroblastoma or medullary thyroid carcinoma. Various approaches to approve effectiveness and limit side effects are being investigated, including radiosensitising drugs, fractionation regimes and new radionuclides. Alpha emitters, which have much shorter ranges in tissue (limiting the effect on nearby healthy tissue), such as bismuth-213 or actinium-225 labelled DOTATOC are of particular interest.

A comparative cohort study of 1051 neuroendocrine tumor patients undergoing ^{90}Y-DOTATOC (n=910) or ^{177}Lu-DOTATOC (n=141) reported no significant difference in overall survival between the groups. However, patients with high tumor accumulation and multiple lesions seemed to benefit from ^{90}Y-DOTATOC, while patients with low tumor burden, solitary lesions and extra-hepatic disease experienced more favorable outcome on ^{177}Lu-DOTATOC. There were significantly fewer cases of transitory hematotoxicity in the ^{177}Lu-DOTATOC group compared with the ^{90}Y-DOTATOC group (1.4% versus 10.1%, p=0.001).

The randomized controlled phase III Neuroendocrine Tumors Therapy (NETTER-1) trial evaluated the efficacy and safety of ^{177}Lu-DOTATATE as compared with high-dose octreotide long-acting repeatable (LAR) in patients with advanced progressive somatostatin-receptor positive midgut neuroendocrine tumors. Patients were randomly assigned to receive either ^{177}Lu-DOTATATE and octreotide LAR at a dose of 30 mg every four weeks for symptom control (n=116) or to only receive octreotide LAR at a dose of 60 mg every four weeks (n=113, control group). In total, 200 out of the 231 patients entered long-term follow-up. Final overall survival in the intention-to-treat population was median 48.0 months in the ^{177}Lu-DOTATATE group versus median 36.3 months in the control group (p=0.30). In other words, there was numerical difference of 11.7 months, not reaching statistical significance. ^{177}Lu-DOTATATE was associated with limited acute toxic effects. In neuroendocrine tumor patients with advanced well-differentiated disease and progression on somatostatin analogs, ^{177}Lu-DOTATATE is likely to reduce the risk of disease progression and be associated with quality-of-life benefits.

== Dosimetry ==
Therapeutic PRRT treatments typically involve several gigabecquerels (GBq) of activity. Several radiopharmaceuticals allow simultaneous imaging and therapy, enabling precise dosimetric estimates to be made. For example, the bremsstrahlung emission from ^{90}Y and gamma emissions from ^{177}Lu can be detected by a gamma camera. In other cases, imaging can be performed by labelling a suitable radionuclide to the same peptide as used for therapy. Radionuclides that can be used for imaging include gallium-68, technetium-99m and fluorine-18.

Currently used peptides can result in high kidney doses, as the radiopharmaceutical is retained for relatively long periods. Renal protection is therefore used in some cases, taking the form of alternative substances that reduce the uptake of the kidneys.

== Availability ==
PRRT is not yet widely available, with various radiopharmaceuticals at different stages of clinical trials. The cost of small volume production of the relevant radionuclides is high. The cost of Lutathera, a commercial ^{177}Lu-DOTATATE product, has been quoted by the manufacturer as £71,500 (€80,000 or $94,000 in July 2018) for 4 administrations of 7.4 GBq.

=== United States ===
^{177}Lu-DOTATATE (international nonproprietary name: lutetium (^{177}Lu) oxodotreotide) was approved by the FDA in early 2018, for treatment of gastroenteropancreatic neuroendocrine tumors (GEP-NETs).

=== Europe ===
Marketing authorisation for ^{177}Lu-DOTATATE was granted by the European Medicines Agency on 26 September 2017. ^{90}Y-DOTATOC (international nonproprietary name: yttrium (^{90}Y) edotreotide) and ^{177}Lu-DOTATOC are designated as orphan drugs, but have not yet received marketing authorisation.

==== United Kingdom ====
In guidance published in August 2018, lutetium (^{177}Lu) oxodotreotide was recommended by NICE for treating unresectable or metastatic neuroendocrine tumours.

=== Turkey ===
The first therapies in Turkey using ^{177}Lu-DOTATATE PRRT were carried out in early 2014, for treatment of gastroenteropancreatic neuroendocrine tumors (GEP-NETs) at the Istanbul University-Cerrahpaşa.

=== Australia ===
Research in Australia into the use of lutetium-177-labelled antibodies for various cancers began in the Department of Nuclear Medicine at Fremantle Hospital and Health Service (FHHS), Fremantle, Australia in the late 1990s. The first therapies in Australia using ^{177}Lu-DOTATATE PRRT for NET began in February 2005 on a trial basis under the Therapeutic Goods Administration's (TGA) Special Access Scheme (SAS) and compassionate usage of unapproved therapeutic goods. Shortly after this, ^{177}Lu-DOTATATE PRRT was provided to Western Australian NET patients on a routine basis under the SAS, as well as under various on-going research trials.

In Australia, most centres synthesise the lutetium-177 peptide on-site from lutetium-177 chloride and the appropriate peptide.

== Side effects ==
Like any form of radiotherapy, ionising radiation can harm healthy tissue as well as the intended treatment target. Radiation from lutetium (^{177}Lu) oxodotreotide can cause damage when the medicine passes through tubules in the kidney. Arginine/lysine can be used to reduce renal radiation exposure during peptide receptor radionuclide therapy with lutetium (^{177}Lu) oxodotreotide.

== See also ==
- Nuclear medicine
- Targeted alpha-particle therapy
