= VIPoma =

Tumor that often causes a syndrome of diarrhea and electrolyte imbalance

- Specialty: Oncology medicine
- Symptoms: watery diarrhea, hypokalemia, achlorhydria
- Usual onset: most patients are middle aged
- Types: usually solitary, 2/3 are malignant
- Prognosis: bad
- Frequency: 0.0001%
- Deaths: frequent

A VIPoma or vipoma (/vɪˈpoʊmə/) is a rare endocrine tumor that overproduces vasoactive intestinal peptide (thus VIP + -oma). The incidence is about 1 per 10,000,000 per year. 90% of VIPomas originate from the non-β islet cells of the pancreas, sometimes associated with multiple endocrine neoplasia type 1. Roughly 50–75% of VIPomas are malignant, but even when they are benign, they are problematic because they tend to cause a specific syndrome: the massive amounts of secreted VIP overstimulates pancreatic bicarbonate and chloride secretion, and its binding to intestinal epithelial cells leads to sodium, chloride and water secretion into the bowel (secretory watery diarrhea, often >3L/day). leading to a syndrome of profound and chronic watery diarrhea and resultant dehydration, hypokalemia, achlorhydria, acidosis, flushing and hypotension (from vasodilation), hypercalcemia, and hyperglycemia. This syndrome is called Verner–Morrison syndrome (VMS), WDHA syndrome (from watery diarrhea–hypokalemia–achlorhydria), or pancreatic cholera syndrome (PCS). The eponym reflects the physicians who first described the syndrome.

== Signs and symptoms ==
The major clinical features are prolonged watery diarrhea (fasting stool volume > 750 to 1000 mL/day) and symptoms of hypokalemia and dehydration. Half of the patients have relatively constant diarrhea while the rest have alternating periods of severe and moderate diarrhea. One third have diarrhea < 1yr before diagnosis, but in 25%, diarrhea is present for 5 yr or more before diagnosis. Lethargy, muscle weakness, nausea, vomiting and crampy abdominal pain are frequent symptoms. Hypokalemia and impaired glucose tolerance occur in < 50% of patients. Achlorhydria is also a feature. During attacks of diarrhea, flushing similar to the carcinoid syndrome occur rarely.

== Diagnosis ==
Besides the clinical picture, fasting VIP plasma level may confirm the diagnosis, and CT scan and somatostatin receptor scintigraphy are used to localise the tumor, which is usually metastatic at presentation.

Tests include:

- Blood chemistry tests (basic or comprehensive metabolic panel)
- CT scan of the abdomen
- MRI of the abdomen
- Stool examination for the cause of diarrhea and electrolyte levels
- Vasoactive intestinal peptide (VIP) level in the blood

== Treatment ==
The first goal of treatment is to correct dehydration. Fluids are often given intravenously to replace those lost during diarrhea. The next goal is to slow the diarrhea. Some medications can help control it. Octreotide, an artificially synthesized form of somatostatin (a naturally occurring hormone), blocks the action of VIP.

The best chance for a cure is surgery to remove the tumor. If the tumor has not spread to other organs, surgery can often achieve this.

For metastatic disease, peptide receptor radionuclide therapy (PRRT) can be highly effective. This treatment involves attaching a radionuclide (Lutetium-177 or Yttrium-90) to a somatostatin analogue (octreotate or octreotide). This is a novel way to deliver high doses of beta radiation to eradicate tumours. Some patients seem to respond to a combination chemotherapy consisting of capecitabine and temozolomide, but there is no report stating its curative effects.

== Prognosis ==
Surgery can usually serve as the cure. However, in one-third to one-half of patients, the tumor has metastasized to other organs by the time of diagnosis and cannot be cured, only treated.
