= Adam Rainer =

Austrian sufferer from dwarfism and gigantism (1899–1950)

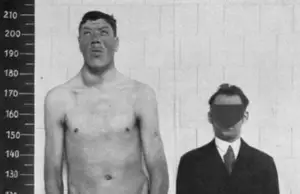
- Adam Rainer (left) and a man of average height, c. 1930
- Born: 2 October 1899; Graz, Austria-Hungary
- Died: 4 March 1950 (aged 51); Vienna, Austria
- Known for: Having both dwarfism and gigantism
- Height: 137.8 cm (4 ft 6.3 in) (Age 18); 234 cm (7 ft 8 in) (Age 51)

Adam Rainer (22 February 1899 – 4 March 1950) was an Austrian man who is the only person in recorded history to have been both a dwarf and a giant. He is believed to have had acromegaly.

== Biography ==
=== Dwarfism ===
Adam Rainer was born in Graz, Austria-Hungary (present-day Austria), on 22 February 1899. As a child, Rainer was described as very small, thin, and weak. In 1917, at age 18, he was measured at 137.8 cm (4 ft 6.3 in). He therefore was refused entry into the Austro-Hungarian Army to take part in World War I. A typical defining characteristic of dwarfism is an adult height below 147 cm (4 ft 10 in).

=== Gigantism ===
Several years later, likely as a result of a pituitary tumor that was identified later, Rainer had a dramatic growth spurt. Between his early 20s to early 30s, he gained height at the average rate of 9.14 cm (3.16 in) per year. By 1932 (aged 33), Rainer had reached a height of 218 cm (7 ft 2 in). He went from shoe size 43 (US shoe size 10) at age 19 to size 57.5 (US 20) only three years later.

Two doctors examined Rainer in detail between August 1930 and May 1931, at which time his height was 216 cm (7 ft 1 in). A benign pituitary adenoma was found, which was responsible for the enormous growth. Dr. Oskar Hirsch removed the adenoma.

Prior to the removal of the tumor, Rainer had already been rendered weak and unable to stand due to his malfunctioning pituitary gland and the rapid growth that resulted. Shortly after the surgery, Rainer entered a "home for the aged" where he resided for the remainder of his life. When he died on 4 March 1950 at the age of 51, he had reached a final height of 234 cm (7 ft 8 in).
