= Arginine/lysine =

Combination drug

Combination of
- Arginine: Amino acid
- Lysine: Amino acid

Clinical data
- Trade names: Lysakare
- Routes of administration: Intravenous infusion
- ATC code: V03AF11 (WHO)

Legal status
- Legal status: UK: POM (Prescription only); EU: Rx-only

Identifiers
- CAS Number: 2447636-40-8
- KEGG: D12136

Arginine/lysine, sold under the brand name Lysakare, is a fixed-dose combination medication used to protect the kidneys from radiation damage during cancer treatment with a radioactive medicine called lutetium (^{177}Lu) oxodotreotide. It contains L-arginine hydrochloride and L-lysine hydrochloride.

The most common side effects include nausea and vomiting. Arginine/lysine is also associated with hyperkalaemia (high blood potassium levels), but the frequency of this side effect is not known. Side effects with arginine/lysine are usually mild or moderate.

Radiation from lutetium (^{177}Lu) oxodotreotide can cause damage when the medicine passes through tubules in the kidney. Arginine and lysine interfere with the passage of lutetium (^{177}Lu) oxodotreotide through these kidney tubules. As a result, the radioactive medicine leaves the body in the urine and the kidneys are exposed to less radiation.

Arginine/lysine was approved for medical use in the European Union in July 2019.

== Medical uses ==
Arginine/lysine is indicated for reduction of renal radiation exposure during peptide receptor radionuclide therapy (PRRT) with lutetium (^{177}Lu) oxodotreotide in adults.
