= Jacob Grommer =

Russian mathematician (1879–1933)

Jacob Grommer (1879–1933) was a Belarusian mathematician.

== Life ==
He was born in 1879 in Brest-Litovsk (then Russia, currently Brest, Belarus). At a young age, he became interested in mathematics, and became a doctoral student under David Hilbert in Gottingen.

After completing his doctoral thesis in 1914, for more than 10 years he served as an assistant of Albert Einstein, working with him in his (unsuccessful) attempts to build a unified field theory.

As early as 1917, Einstein asked Paul Ehrenfest for help finding a place for Grommer, a “true Russian” in his words, in the USSR. Later Einstein facilitated Grommer’s contacts with Russian physicists to arrange his appointment as a professor of the Belarusian State University in Minsk in 1929. Shortly afterwards, Grommer was elected as a member of the Belarusian Academy of Sciences.

He died peacefully in 1933. Starting from 1937, he was a non-person in the annals of the Belarusian Academy, and in Russia in general.

Grommer made contributions to mathematical physics, complex analysis, and analytic number theory.

Grommer suffered from acromegaly, giving him a deformed appearance that impeded his career.

== Sources ==
- As of [[Special:Permalink/{{{revision}}}|this edit]], this article uses content from "Mathematicians Going East", authored by Pasha Zusmanovich, which is licensed in a way that permits reuse under the Creative Commons Attribution-ShareAlike 4.0 International License, but not under the GFDL. All relevant terms must be followed.
