= Edotreotide =

Names
- IUPAC name 2-[4-[2-[[(2R)-1-[[(4R,7S,10S,13R,16S,19R)-10-(4-aminobutyl)-4-[[(2R,3R)-1,3-dihydroxybutan-2-yl]carbamoyl]-7-[(1R)-1-hydroxyethyl]-16-[(4-hydroxyphenyl)methyl]-13-(1H-indol-3-ylmethyl)-6,9,12,15,18-pentaoxo-1,2-dithia-5,8,11,14,17-pentazacycloicos-19-yl]amino]-1-oxo-3-phenylpropan-2-yl]amino]-2-oxoethyl]-7,10-bis(carboxymethyl)-1,4,7,10-tetrazacyclododec-1-yl]acetic acid
- Other names SomaKit TOC

Identifiers
CAS Number	204318-14-9
3D model (JSmol)	Interactive image
ChEMBL	ChEMBL408350
ChemSpider	139675
DrugBank	DB15494
PubChem CID	158782
UNII	U194AS08HZ
CompTox Dashboard (EPA)	DTXSID701021591
- InChI: InChI=1S/C65H92N14O18S2/c1-39(81)51(36-80)72-64(96)53-38-99-98-37-52(73-60(92)48(28-41-10-4-3-5-11-41)68-54(84)32-76-20-22-77(33-55(85)86)24-26-79(35-57(89)90)27-25-78(23-21-76)34-56(87)88)63(95)70-49(29-42-15-17-44(83)18-16-42)61(93)71-50(30-43-31-67-46-13-7-6-12-45(43)46)62(94)69-47(14-8-9-19-66)59(91)75-58(40(2)82)65(97)74-53/h3-7,10-13,15-18,31,39-40,47-53,58,67,80-83H,8-9,14,19-30,32-38,66H2,1-2H3,(H,68,84)(H,69,94)(H,70,95)(H,71,93)(H,72,96)(H,73,92)(H,74,97)(H,75,91)(H,85,86)(H,87,88)(H,89,90)/t39-,40-,47+,48-,49+,50-,51-,52+,53+,58+/m1/s1 Key: RZHKDBRREKOZEW-AAXZNHDCSA-N; InChI=1/C65H92N14O18S2/c1-39(81)51(36-80)72-64(96)53-38-99-98-37-52(73-60(92)48(28-41-10-4-3-5-11-41)68-54(84)32-76-20-22-77(33-55(85)86)24-26-79(35-57(89)90)27-25-78(23-21-76)34-56(87)88)63(95)70-49(29-42-15-17-44(83)18-16-42)61(93)71-50(30-43-31-67-46-13-7-6-12-45(43)46)62(94)69-47(14-8-9-19-66)59(91)75-58(40(2)82)65(97)74-53/h3-7,10-13,15-18,31,39-40,47-53,58,67,80-83H,8-9,14,19-30,32-38,66H2,1-2H3,(H,68,84)(H,69,94)(H,70,95)(H,71,93)(H,72,96)(H,73,92)(H,74,97)(H,75,91)(H,85,86)(H,87,88)(H,89,90)/t39-,40-,47+,48-,49+,50-,51-,52+,53+,58+/m1/s1 Key: RZHKDBRREKOZEW-AAXZNHDCBX
- SMILES: C[C@H]([C@H]1C(=O)N[C@@H](CSSC[C@@H](C(=O)N[C@H](C(=O)N[C@@H](C(=O)N[C@H](C(=O)N1)CCCCN)Cc2c[nH]c3c2cccc3)Cc4ccc(cc4)O)NC(=O)[C@@H](Cc5ccccc5)NC(=O)CN6CCN(CCN(CCN(CC6)CC(=O)O)CC(=O)O)CC(=O)O)C(=O)N[C@H](CO)[C@@H](C)O)O

Properties
Chemical formula	C_{65}H_{92}N_{14}O_{18}S_{2}
Molar mass	1421.65 g·mol^{−1}

Pharmacology
License data	EU EMA: by INN
Legal status	UK: POM (Prescription only); EU: Rx-only
- Except where otherwise noted, data are given for materials in their standard state (at 25 °C [77 °F], 100 kPa). verify (what is ?) Infobox references

Edotreotide (USAN, also known as (DOTA^{0}-Phe^{1}-Tyr^{3}) octreotide, DOTA-TOC, DOTATOC) is a substance which, when bound to various radionuclides, is used in the treatment and diagnosis of certain types of cancer. When used therapeutically it is an example of peptide receptor radionuclide therapy.

== Yttrium-90 ==
A phase I clinical trial of yttrium-90 labelled edotreotide concluded in 2011, aiming to investigated effects in young cancer patients (up to 25 years of age). Specific cancers being included in the trial include neuroblastoma, childhood brain tumours and gastrointestinal cancer.

A phase II trial for the use of ^{90}Y DOTA-TOC for patients with metastatic carcinoid, where octreotide treatment was no longer effective, also reported results in 2010.

Yttrium-90 labeled edotreotide

== Lutetium-177 ==
Lutetium-177 labelled edotreotide (^{177}Lu-DOTA-TOC), with the trade name Solucin, is the subject of a phase 3 clinical trial for treatment of GEP-NETs. It was granted orphan drug designation by the European Medicines Agency in 2014.

== See also ==
- DOTA-TATE, a similar compound
