= DOTA-TATE =

Eight amino-acid long peptide covalently bonded to a DOTA chelator

Names
- Other names DOTA-(Tyr^{3})-octreotate

Identifiers
| CAS Number | 177943-89-4 |
| 3D model (JSmol) | Interactive image |
| ChemSpider | 9345959 |
| PubChem CID | 11170867 |
| UNII | 99R86Y6V0M |
| CompTox Dashboard (EPA) | DTXSID60170399 |
- InChI: InChI=1S/C65H90N14O19S2/c1-38(80)56-64(96)73-51(63(95)75-57(39(2)81)65(97)98)37-100-99-36-50(72-59(91)47(28-40-10-4-3-5-11-40)68-52(83)32-76-20-22-77(33-53(84)85)24-26-79(35-55(88)89)27-25-78(23-21-76)34-54(86)87)62(94)70-48(29-41-15-17-43(82)18-16-41)60(92)71-49(30-42-31-67-45-13-7-6-12-44(42)45)61(93)69-46(58(90)74-56)14-8-9-19-66/h3-7,10-13,15-18,31,38-39,46-51,56-57,67,80-82H,8-9,14,19-30,32-37,66H2,1-2H3,(H,68,83)(H,69,93)(H,70,94)(H,71,92)(H,72,91)(H,73,96)(H,74,90)(H,75,95)(H,84,85)(H,86,87)(H,88,89)(H,97,98)/t38-,39-,46+,47-,48+,49-,50+,51+,56+,57+/m1/s1 Key: QVFLVLMYXXNJDT-CSBVGUNJSA-N; InChI=1/C65H90N14O19S2/c1-38(80)56-64(96)73-51(63(95)75-57(39(2)81)65(97)98)37-100-99-36-50(72-59(91)47(28-40-10-4-3-5-11-40)68-52(83)32-76-20-22-77(33-53(84)85)24-26-79(35-55(88)89)27-25-78(23-21-76)34-54(86)87)62(94)70-48(29-41-15-17-43(82)18-16-41)60(92)71-49(30-42-31-67-45-13-7-6-12-44(42)45)61(93)69-46(58(90)74-56)14-8-9-19-66/h3-7,10-13,15-18,31,38-39,46-51,56-57,67,80-82H,8-9,14,19-30,32-37,66H2,1-2H3,(H,68,83)(H,69,93)(H,70,94)(H,71,92)(H,72,91)(H,73,96)(H,74,90)(H,75,95)(H,84,85)(H,86,87)(H,88,89)(H,97,98)/t38-,39-,46+,47-,48+,49-,50+,51+,56+,57+/m1/s1 Key: QVFLVLMYXXNJDT-CSBVGUNJBN
- SMILES: C[C@H]([C@H]1C(=O)N[C@@H](CSSC[C@@H](C(=O)N[C@H](C(=O)N[C@@H](C(=O)N[C@H](C(=O)N1)CCCCN)CC2=CNC3=CC=CC=C32)CC4=CC=C(C=C4)O)NC(=O)[C@@H](CC5=CC=CC=C5)NC(=O)CN6CCN(CCN(CCN(CC6)CC(=O)O)CC(=O)O)CC(=O)O)C(=O)N[C@@H]([C@@H](C)O)C(=O)O)O

Properties
| Chemical formula | C_{65}H_{90}N_{14}O_{19}S_{2} |
| Molar mass | 1435.63 g·mol^{−1} |
- Except where otherwise noted, data are given for materials in their standard state (at 25 °C [77 °F], 100 kPa). Infobox references

DOTA-TATE (DOTATATE, DOTA-octreotate, oxodotreotide, DOTA-(Tyr^{3})-octreotate, and DOTA-0-Tyr3-Octreotate) is an eight amino acid long peptide, with a covalently bonded DOTA bifunctional chelator.

DOTA-TATE can be reacted with the radionuclides gallium-68 (T_{1/2} = 68 min), lutetium-177 (T_{1/2} = 6.65 d) and copper-64 (T_{1/2} = 12.7 h) to form radiopharmaceuticals for positron emission tomography (PET) imaging or radionuclide therapy. ^{177}Lu DOTA-TATE therapy is a form of peptide receptor radionuclide therapy (PRRT) which targets somatostatin receptors (SSR). In that form of application it is a form of targeted drug delivery.

== Chemistry and mechanism of action ==
DOTA-TATE is a compound containing tyrosine^{3}-octreotate, an SSR agonist, and the bifunctional chelator DOTA (tetraxetan). SSRs are found with high density in numerous malignancies, including CNS, breast, lung, and lymphatics. The role of SSR agonists (i.e. somatostatin and its analogs such as octreotide, somatuline and vapreotide) in neuroendocrine tumours (NETs) is well established, and massive SSR overexpression is present in several NETs. (Tyr^{3})-octreotate binds the transmembrane receptors of NETs with highest activity for SSR2 and is actively transported into the cell via endocytosis, allowing trapping of the radioactivity and increasing the probability of the desired double-strand DNA breakage (for tumour control). Trapping improves the probability of this kind of effect due to the relatively short range of the beta particles emitted by ^{177}Lu, which have a maximum range in tissue of <2 mm. Bystander effects include cellular damage by free radical formation.

== Clinical applications ==
=== Gallium-68 DOTA-TATE ===
^{68}Ga DOTA-TATE (gallium-68 dotatate, GaTate) is used to measure tumor SSR density and whole-body bio-distribution via PET imaging. ^{68}Ga DOTA-TATE imagery has a much higher sensitivity and resolution compared to ^{111}In octreotide gamma camera or SPECT scans, due to intrinsic modality differences. It is commonly used to confirm the presence of paragangliomas and pheochromocytomas.

=== Copper-64 DOTA-TATE ===
Copper (^{64}Cu) oxodotreotide or copper Cu 64 dotatate, sold under the brand name Detectnet, is a radioactive diagnostic agent indicated for use with positron emission tomography (PET) for localization of somatostatin receptor positive neuroendocrine tumors (NETs) in adults. It was FDA approved in September 2020. These are the same indications for as the gallium DOTA-TATE scans, but Cu-64 has advantages over Ga-68 in having a 12-hour half life rather than the much shorter one-hour half life of Ga-68, making it easier to transport from central production locations.

=== Lutetium-177 DOTA-TATE ===
The combination of the beta emitter ^{177}Lu with DOTA-TATE can be used in the treatment of cancers expressing the relevant somatostatin receptors. The U.S. Food and Drug Administration (FDA) considers ^{177}Lu-dotatate to be a first-in-class medication.

Alternatives to ^{177}Lu-DOTA-TATE include ^{90}Y (T_{1/2} = 64.6 h) DOTA-TATE. The longer penetration range in the target tissues of the more energetic beta particles emitted by ^{90}Y (high average beta energy of 0.9336 MeV) could make it more suitable for large tumors while ^{177}Lu would be preferred for smaller volume tumors.

== See also ==
- Lutetium
- ^{64}Cu-dotatate
