= Lanreotide =

Pharmaceutical drug

Clinical data
- Trade names: Somatuline
- Other names: Lanreotide acetate (JAN JP), Lanreotide acetate (USAN US)
- AHFS/Drugs.com: Monograph
- License data: US DailyMed: Lanreotide; US FDA: Lanreotide
- Pregnancy category: AU: C
- Routes of administration: Intramuscular, subcutaneous
- ATC code: H01CB03 (WHO)

Legal status
- Legal status: AU: S4 (Prescription only); UK: POM (Prescription only); US: ℞-only

Pharmacokinetic data
- Bioavailability: Approximately 80%
- Protein binding: 78%
- Metabolism: In GI tract
- Elimination half-life: 2 hours (immediate release); 5 days (sustained release)
- Excretion: Mostly bile duct

Identifiers
- IUPAC name: 3-(2-naphthyl)-D-alanyl-L-cysteinyl-L-tyrosyl-D-tryptophyl-L-lysyl-L-valyl-L-cysteinyl-L-threoninamide (2->7)-disulfide
- CAS Number: 108736-35-2
- PubChem CID: 71349
- IUPHAR/BPS: 2031
- DrugBank: DB06791
- ChemSpider: 64450
- UNII: 0G3DE8943Y
- KEGG: D04666
- ChEMBL: ChEMBL1201185
- CompTox Dashboard (EPA): DTXSID60897514
- ECHA InfoCard: 100.215.992

Chemical and physical data
- Formula: C_{54}H_{69}N_{11}O_{10}S_{2}
- Molar mass: 1096.33 g·mol^{−1}
- 3D model (JSmol): Interactive image
- SMILES: C[C@H]([C@@H](C(=O)N)NC(=O)[C@@H]1CSSC[C@@H](C(=O)N[C@H](C(=O)N[C@@H](C(=O)N[C@H](C(=O)N[C@H](C(=O)N1)C(C)C)CCCCN)Cc2c[nH]c3c2cccc3)Cc4ccc(cc4)O)NC(=O)[C@@H](Cc5ccc6ccccc6c5)N)O
- InChI: InChI=1S/C54H69N11O10S2/c1-29(2)45-54(75)63-44(53(74)65-46(30(3)66)47(57)68)28-77-76-27-43(62-48(69)38(56)23-32-15-18-33-10-4-5-11-34(33)22-32)52(73)60-41(24-31-16-19-36(67)20-17-31)50(71)61-42(25-35-26-58-39-13-7-6-12-37(35)39)51(72)59-40(49(70)64-45)14-8-9-21-55/h4-7,10-13,15-20,22,26,29-30,38,40-46,58,66-67H,8-9,14,21,23-25,27-28,55-56H2,1-3H3,(H2,57,68)(H,59,72)(H,60,73)(H,61,71)(H,62,69)(H,63,75)(H,64,70)(H,65,74)/t30-,38-,40+,41+,42-,43+,44+,45+,46+/m1/s1; Key:PUDHBTGHUJUUFI-SCTWWAJVSA-N

Lanreotide, sold under the brand name Somatuline among others, is a medication used in the management of acromegaly and symptoms caused by neuroendocrine tumors, most notably carcinoid syndrome. It is a long-acting analogue of somatostatin, like octreotide.

Lanreotide (as lanreotide acetate) is manufactured by Ipsen. It is available in several countries, including the United Kingdom, Australia and Canada, and was approved for sale in the United States by the Food and Drug Administration (FDA) on August 30, 2007.

== Medical uses ==
Lanreotide is used in the treatment of acromegaly, due to both pituitary and non-pituitary growth hormone-secreting tumors, and the management of symptoms caused by neuroendocrine tumors, particularly carcinoid tumors and VIPomas. In the United States and Canada, lanreotide is only indicated for the treatment of acromegaly. In the United Kingdom, it is also indicated in the treatment of thyrotrophic adenoma, a rare tumor of the pituitary gland which secretes TSH.

Lanreotide also shows activity against non-endocrine tumors, and, along with other somatostatin analogues, is being studied as a possible general antitumor agent.

In December 2014, the US FDA approved lanreotide for the treatment of people with unresectable, well or moderately differentiated, locally advanced or metastatic gastroenteropancreatic neuroendocrine tumors (GEP-NETs).

It is used for polycystic liver disease. It has also been shown that it reduces the volume by 264mls on average.

== Side effects ==
The main side effects of lanreotide treatment are mild to moderate pain at the injection site and gastrointestinal disturbances, such as diarrhea, nausea and vomiting. Isolated cases of gallstone formation have been associated with use of lanreotide, particularly over long periods of time.

== Pharmacology ==
Lanreotide is a synthetic analogue of somatostatin, a naturally occurring inhibitory hormone which blocks the release of several other hormones, including growth hormone, thyroid-stimulating hormone (TSH), insulin and glucagon. Lanreotide binds to the same receptors as somatostatin, although with higher affinity to peripheral receptors, and has similar activity. However, while somatostatin is quickly broken down in the body (within minutes), lanreotide has a much longer half-life, and produces far more prolonged effects.

== Formulations ==
Lanreotide is available in two formulations: a sustained release formulation (sold under the trade name 'Somatuline LA'), which is injected intramuscularly every ten or fourteen days, and an extended release formulation (UK trade name 'Somatuline Autogel', or 'Somatuline Depot' in the US), which is administered subcutaneously once a month.

== Self-assembling properties ==
Lanreotide has been shown to spontaneously self-assemble into monodisperse nanotubes of 24.4 nm diameter and has been thereafter used as a fruitful and versatile model system in several biophysical studies.
