= Somatostatin receptor 2 =

Protein-coding gene in the species Homo sapiens

SSTR2

Identifiers
- Aliases: SSTR2, Somatostatin receptor 2
- External IDs: OMIM: 182452; MGI: 98328; GeneCards: SSTR2

Gene location (Human)
Chr.	Chromosome 17 (human)
Band	17q25.1	Start	73,165,010 bp
Band	17q25.1	End	73,176,633 bp

Gene location (Mouse)
Chr.	Chromosome 11 (mouse)
Band	11 E2|11 79.05 cM	Start	113,510,168 bp
Band	11 E2|11 79.05 cM	End	113,516,854 bp
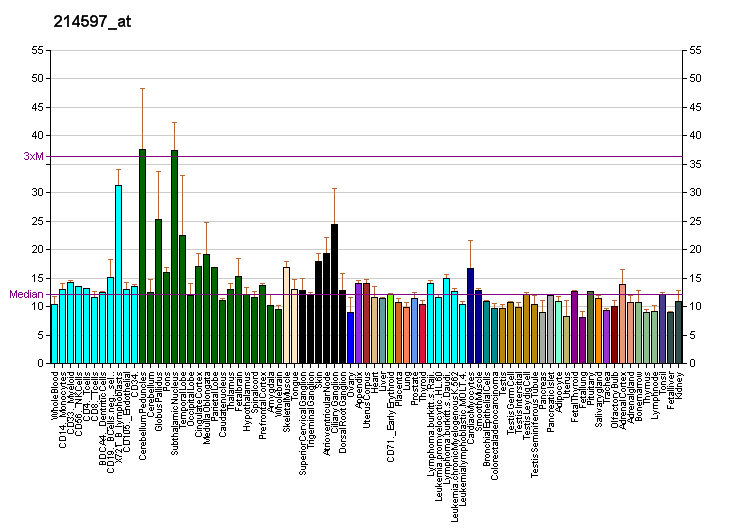

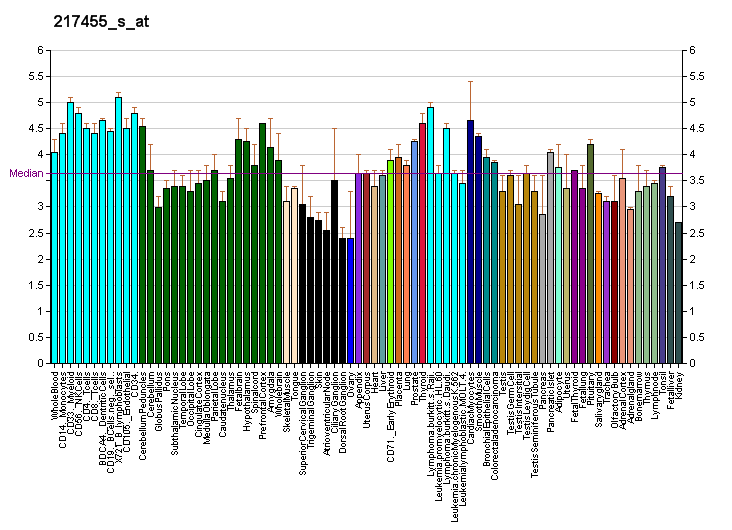
RNA expression pattern
Bgee	Human / Mouse (ortholog); Top expressed in: buccal mucosa cell; ganglionic eminence; cerebellar cortex; cerebellar hemisphere; islet of Langerhans; right hemisphere of cerebellum; cerebellar vermis; paraflocculus of cerebellum; superior frontal gyrus; prefrontal cortex / Top expressed in: superior surface of tongue; gallbladder; habenula; ventricular zone; cingulate gyrus; anterior amygdaloid area; primary motor cortex; ganglionic eminence; cardiac muscle tissue of left ventricle; piriform cortex; More reference expression data
BioGPS	More reference expression data
Gene ontology
Molecular function	protein binding; signal transducer activity; G protein-coupled receptor activity; neuropeptide binding; PDZ domain binding; somatostatin receptor activity; peptide binding
Cellular component	integral component of plasma membrane; cytoplasm; integral component of membrane; membrane; neuron projection; plasma membrane; cytosol
Biological process	cerebellum development; regulation of muscle contraction; neuropeptide signaling pathway; peristalsis; cellular response to glucocorticoid stimulus; response to starvation; adenylate cyclase-inhibiting G protein-coupled receptor signaling pathway; negative regulation of cell population proliferation; G protein-coupled receptor signaling pathway, coupled to cyclic nucleotide second messenger; spermatogenesis; cellular response to estradiol stimulus; signal transduction; forebrain development; somatostatin signaling pathway; G protein-coupled receptor signaling pathway
Sources:Amigo / QuickGO
Orthologs
Databases	NCBI: entry; OMA: entry
Species	Human	Mouse
Entrez	6752	20606
Ensembl	ENSG00000180616	ENSMUSG00000047904
UniProt	P30874	P30875
RefSeq (mRNA)	NM_001050	NM_001042606; NM_009217
RefSeq (protein)	NP_001041	NP_001036071; NP_033243
Location (UCSC)	Chr 17: 73.17 – 73.18 Mb	Chr 11: 113.51 – 113.52 Mb
PubMed search
- Wikidata
View/Edit Human	View/Edit Mouse

Somatostatin receptor type 2 is a protein that in humans is encoded by the SSTR2 gene.

The SSTR2 gene is located on chromosome 17 on the long arm in position 25.1 in humans. It is also found in most other vertebrates.

The somatostatin receptor 2 (SSTR2), which belongs to the G-protein coupled receptor family, is a protein which is most highly expressed in the pancreas (both alpha- and beta-cells), but also in other tissues such as the cerebrum and kidney and in lower amount in the jejunum, colon and liver. In the pancreas, after binding to somatostatin, it inhibits the secretion of peptide hormones from pancreatic islets. During development, it stimulates neuronal migration and axon outgrowth.

The somatostatin receptor 2 is expressed in most tumors. Patients with neuroendocrine tumors that over-express the somatostatin receptor 2 have an improved prognosis. The over expression of SSTR2 in tumors can be exploited to selectively deliver radio-peptides to tumors to either detect or destroy them. Somatostatin receptor 2 also has the ability to stimulate apoptosis in many cells including cancer cells. The somatostatin receptor 2 is also being looked at as a possible target in cancer treatment for its ability to inhibit tumor growth.

== Function ==
The gene for somatostatin receptor 2, SSTR2 for short, is responsible for making a receptor for the signalling peptide, somatostatin (SST). Production occurs in the central nervous system, especially the hypothalamus, as well as the digestive system, and pancreas. SSTR2 is a receptor for somatostatin-14 and -28 respectively. The numbers 14 and 28 represent the amount of amino acids in each protein sequence. All somatostatin receptors including SSTR2 may have different specific functions, but all fall under the same receptor super family, the G-protein binding family and all of which are a major inhibitor for other hormones. For all somatostatin inhibitors, somatostatin-14 and -28 work by binding to the receptor with the help of a G-protein. This inhibits adenylyl cyclase and calcium channels. These proteins are released in various parts of the human body and vary in the amount emitted from each organ system. In secretory cells this protein is in a greater volume compared to amount released from activated immune and inflammatory cells. These proteins have a tendency of being emitted in response to items such as: ions, nutrients, neuropeptides, neurotransmitters, hormones, growth factors, and cytokines.

In general, somatostatin can put a cell in cycle arrest using the phosphotyrosine phosphatase dependent regulation of nitrogen-activated protein kinase, this process can lead to a halt in the cell cycle or apoptosis of the cell and is used as a tumor suppressor in the genome. This hormone is also known to perform agonist-dependent endocytosis, which allows a cell to take in receptors, ions, and other molecules.

Because this protein is found in multiple organs, it has a different specific role in each organ or organ system. A major function of the protein made by the gene SSTR2 is pancreatic interaction with the alpha and beta cells. In the delta cells of the pancreas, this hormone inhibits the secretion of both glucagon and insulin in the alpha and beta cells when stimulated by basic nutrients like sugars, proteins, and fats. In fact, this protein, is the dominant one out of all of the somatostatins in the pancreas. In the stomach, it reduces activity of the digestive tract by inhibiting secretion of gastric acid, pepsin, bile, and colonic acid when in the presence of luminal nutrients; all of these secretions are needed for proper digestion. It also represses motor activity in the gut by blocking segmentation of the intestines, gallbladder contraction, and emptying of the bowels. This inhibition by somatostatin allows the body to uptake the maximum amount of nutrients in the digestive system. Along with the gut and pancreas, SSTR2 also inhibits secretion of neurotransmitters in the central and peripheral nervous system. These hormones include dopamine, norepinephrine, thyrotropin-releasing hormone, and corticotropin-releasing hormone. Many of these hormones help the body maintain homeostasis or react properly to a stimulus such as something pleasurable or a stress in the environment. Because of which, the receptors for somatostatin type 2 impact the body's locomotor, sensory, autonomic, and cognitive functions.

== Interactions ==
Somatostatin receptor 2 has been shown to interact with SHANK2.

== Clinical significance ==
The somatostatin hormone itself can negatively affect the uptake of hormones in the body and may play a role in some hormonal conditions. Somatostatin 2 receptors have been found in concentration on the surface of tumor cells, particularly those associated with the neuroendocrine system where the overexpression of somatostatin can lead to many complications Due to this, these receptors are considered a prospective aid for the detection of tumors, especially in patients who present with conditions like hypothyroidism and Cushing's syndrome. A synthetic version of the somatostatin hormone, octreotide, has been successfully used in combination with radio-peptide tracers to locate adrenal gland tumors through scintigraphic imaging. A similar method may be utilized to carry and more accurately administer radioactive treatments to tumors. Octreotide and other analogs are preferred for this use due to their possessing of an extended half life compared to the naturally occurring hormone allowing for more flexibility when used for such treatments.

The association of somatostatin 2 receptors on tumors has also led to the suggestion of possible alternatives to current tumor treatment methods. The binding of synthetic somatostatin hormones such as octreotide to receptors has been seen to reduce the production of hormones and is now being considered for use in the treatment of some pituitary tumors.

SSTR2 is also being investigated for its potential use as a reporter gene for the visualization of regional gene expression. One study tested this by comparing the PET/CT and light imaging results of laboratory rats' musculature obtained through the use of a human somatostatin receptor 2 vector and a control luciferase vector. The study suggests that somatostatin receptor genes could be an effective substitute for the current viral-based vectors since the sstr genes elicits less of an immune response and has overall been well tolerated by the trial patients' bodies. This form of treatment may be especially useful for the study of gene expression in larger mammals whose larger body mass may obstruct clear visualization of deep tissue areas. The use of sstr2 and sstr5 as biomarkers to track the progress of and treat neuroendocrine tumors displaying circulating tumor cells is also being investigated due to these cells' somatostatin receptor gene expressivity.

== Therapeutic targeting ==
Most pituitary adenomas express SSTR2, but other somatostatin receptors are also found. Somatostatin analogs (i.e. Octreotide, Lanreotide ) are used to stimulate these receptors, and thus to inhibit further tumor proliferation.

== Selective ligands ==
Agonists

- BIM-23027
- Branosotine
- L-054522
- L-779976
- Paltusotine is a selective oral once-daily nonpeptide SSTR2 agonist for long-term maintenance therapy of acromegaly in adults.

== Discovery ==
There is a group of somatostatin receptors called the somatostatin receptor family. All of the members of the somatostatin receptor family are proteins that sit on the surface of the cell membrane and are responsible for the communication between cells. In 1972, scientists were on the trek to discover more information on the hypothalamus and its "release factors." Studies showed patterns of inhibitory activity of the hypothalamus release factors which led scientists in the direction to discover somatostatin, known as the somatropin release-inhibiting factor, or SRIF. We now know that the SRIF is located at 3q28 (long arm of the third chromosome at the twenty-eighth position) in humans. Peering into location 3q28, the majority of proteins code for the pancreas, ovaries, and prostate along with other components of the endocrine system and nervous system, so it can be drawn that the receptor family has great influence among these systems. The family was first discovered in a segment of a rat's pituitary gland known as the tumor cell line. A cell line is grown as a culture under controlled conditions, so the first discovery was found by culturing these cells in controlled conditions and in an environment outside of its norm. There, researchers found that the tumor cell line expresses a cell dividing inhibitor known as the transforming growth factor beta (TGF-beta) and also acts as an inhibitor to the milk producing hormone in female mammals, prolactin, and growth hormones. Researchers studied the activity of the receptors by conducting an assay with Ligand binding studies, which basically means they were conducting studies to see how prevalent the binding of the receptors occurred. Differences in how prevalently they receptors bonded revealed the existence of multiple receptors. Based on the ligand binding affinity and the receptors' signaling mechanisms, the receptor family was divided into 2 different groups, and within those groups, 5 subgroups. The group with a high affinity binding were classified under the SRIF1 group with sst2, sst3, and sst5 in the subgroup, while the receptors with low affinity binding were classified under the SRIF2 group with sst1 and sst4 in the subgroup. Manipulations with the somatostatin receptors are used for many therapies in both the endocrine and nervous system, and now that we know the groups and subgroups of the receptor family, therapy treatment is much more efficient and effective. For example, as you continue reading the article, you will notice the importance and advancements of oncology and tumor treatments, as well as other ways the somatostatin receptors are working and advancing the world of medicine.

The somatostatin receptor 2 is found on the chromosome 17. Information was gathered and determined from a sample of individuals, and conclusions were drawn upon location and other information regarding the SSRT2 protein.

Gene:	SSTR2
Title:	somatostatin receptor 2
Location:	73,165,021..73,171,955
Length:	6,935 nt
[Positional Info]	
NC_000017.11 position:	73,168,608
Gene position:	3,588

== Isoforms ==
Like other proteins, the somatostatin receptor 2 also has variants. Somatostatin receptor 2 exists in two isoforms that are different in carboxy-terimini compositions and size. Alternative splicing of the somatostatin receptor 2 mRNA resulted in two variants, somatostatin receptor 2a (SSTR2A) and somatostatin receptor 2b (SSTR2B). In a rodent, somatostatin receptor 2a is longer compared to the shorter somatostatin receptor 2b. Isoform a and isoform b sequences are different, beginning at the C-terminal regulatory domains. Studies have shown that carboxy-terminal splicing has occurred in many other transmembrane receptors, along with prostaglandin E receptor (EP3). These variants, SST2A receptor and SST2B receptor are seen in some brain and spinal cord areas in a rodent. Somatostatin receptor 2a has a shorter transcript, but is longer than somatostatin receptor 2b and has a unique C- terminus compared to Somatostatin Receptor 2b. SSTRB receptor has approximately 300 nucleotides between carboxyl terminus and transmembrane segments fewer than the original Somatostatin receptor 2. SST2A receptor is made up of 369 amino acids and 346 amino acids make up the SST2B receptor. Somatostatin receptor 2a and somatostatin receptor 2b were found in the medulla oblongata, mesencephalon, testis, cortex, hypothalamus, hippocampus and pituitary of a rodent, using reverse transcription polymerase chain reaction (RT-PCR). Somatostatin receptor 2a is highly evident in the cortex, but the somatostatin receptor 2b is not seen as much. The medulla oblongata shows equal amounts of the two variants being expressed. The Somatostatin receptor 2a was found mostly in far down layers of the cerebral cortex, in the human brain. This variant of the Somatostatin receptor was found with the use of immunohistochemistry. The difference in ratios of the isoforms imply a tissue-specific control of transcription. Somatostatin receptor 2b is not shown expressed without somatostatin receptor 2a in the brain.
