= Somatostatin receptor =

Cell surface protein binding somatostatin and triggering intracellular changes

somatostatin receptor 1

Identifiers
- Symbol: SSTR1
- NCBI gene: 6751
- HGNC: 11330
- OMIM: 182451
- RefSeq: NM_001049
- UniProt: P30872

Other data
- Locus: Chr. 14 q13
Search for
- Structures: Swiss-model
- Domains: InterPro

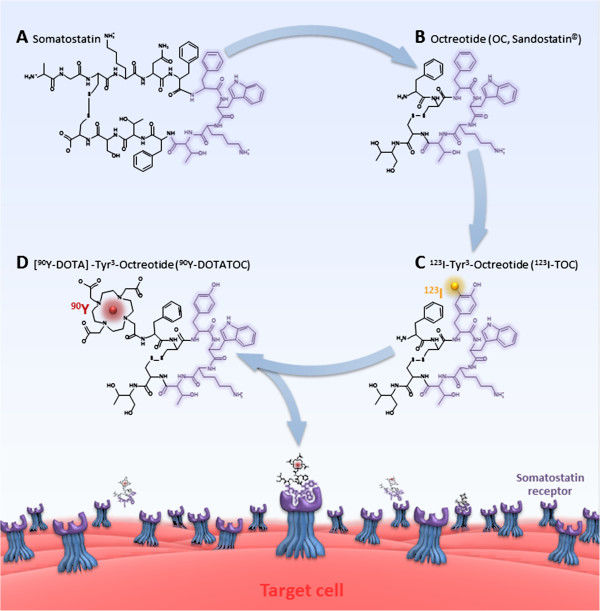
The evolution of somatostatin receptor targeting drugs, from the natural somatostatin-14 to DOTA-TOC

somatostatin receptor 2

Identifiers
- Symbol: SSTR2
- NCBI gene: 6752
- HGNC: 11331
- OMIM: 182452
- RefSeq: NM_001050
- UniProt: P30874

Other data
- Locus: Chr. 17 q24
Search for
- Structures: Swiss-model
- Domains: InterPro

somatostatin receptor 3

Identifiers
- Symbol: SSTR3
- NCBI gene: 6753
- HGNC: 11332
- OMIM: 182453
- RefSeq: NM_001051
- UniProt: P32745

Other data
- Locus: Chr. 22 q13.1
Search for
- Structures: Swiss-model
- Domains: InterPro

somatostatin receptor 4

Identifiers
- Symbol: SSTR4
- NCBI gene: 6754
- HGNC: 11333
- OMIM: 182454
- RefSeq: NM_001052
- UniProt: P31391

Other data
- Locus: Chr. 20 p11.2
Search for
- Structures: Swiss-model
- Domains: InterPro

somatostatin receptor 5

Identifiers
- Symbol: SSTR5
- NCBI gene: 6755
- HGNC: 11334
- OMIM: 182455
- RefSeq: NM_001053
- UniProt: P35346

Other data
- Locus: Chr. 16 p13.3
Search for
- Structures: Swiss-model
- Domains: InterPro

Somatostatin receptors are receptors for somatostatin, a small neuropeptide associated with inhibitory signaling in wide range of tissues, including the brain and digestive system. Some of its better understood functions include inhibiting hormone secretion (notably growth hormone) in the pituitary gland and digestive system, and inhibiting gastric acid, pancreatic juice, and intestinal fluid secretion in the GI tract. These diverse functions are enabled by tissue specific expression of the different types of somatostatin receptors.

Somatostatin is also involved in the post-synaptic response to NMDA receptor co-stimulation/activation. The Somatostatin gene is very susceptible to gene promoter region activation by transcription factor CREB, and in fact CREB was first described based on its regulation of somatostatin.

There are five known somatostatin receptors:

- SST_{1} (SSTR1)
- SST_{2} (SSTR2)
- SST_{3} (SSTR3)
- SST_{4} (SSTR4)
- SST_{5} (SSTR5)

All are G protein-coupled seven transmembrane receptors, and all are coupled to inhibitory (Gi alpha subunit family) G-proteins.

== Anti-secretion effects by receptor ==
One of the core functions of somatostatin is its inhibition of various types of secretions, both endocrine and exocrine. Note the following results are based on knock-out studies in mice.

=== Pituitary gland ===
- Growth hormone inhibition — SSTR2, SSTR5, and to a lesser extent SSTR1
- Prolactin inhibition — SSTR1, SSTR5
- ACTH inhibition — SSTR2, SSTR5

=== Thyroid gland ===
- Calcitonin inhibition — SSTR1

=== Pancreatic islets ===
- Insulin inhibition — SSTR2, SSTR5
- Glucagon inhibition — SSTR2

=== Digestive system ===
- Gastric acid inhibition — SSTR2
- GLP-1 inhibition — SSTR5
- Amylase inhibition — SSTR5

=== Immune system ===
- Interferon gamma inhibition — SSTR2

== Clinical significance ==
Mutations of these receptors have not been well established to cause disease, potentially due to the large number of receptors and redundancy in their function. Nevertheless, these receptors are significant in their relationship with cancer and being the target of multiple FDA-approved drugs, including octreotide, lanreotide, and pasireotide.

Acromegaly is a disease caused by excessive growth hormone production. Somatostatin analogues with strong SSTR2 affinity are typically used to help suppress this excessive production. In particular lanreotide and octreotide have been shown to be safe and effective for long term use.

Cushing's disease is a disease characterized by excessive ACTH secretion in the pituitary leading to excessive corticosteroid levels. ACTH producing cells (corticotropic cell) strongly express SSTR5, and so Pasireotide, which preferentially targets SSTR5, is sometimes used to treat this disease. In particular, it is approved in the US as a second-line treatment when surgery can’t be done or isn’t effective.

Somatostatin receptor targeting drugs are commonly given for the treatment of certain types of cancer, in particular neuroendocrine tumors (NETs). This is aimed at both reducing the size of the tumor and alleviating symptoms by reducing abnormal hormone production. The cells in NETs often express surface SSTR2 receptors, and so either lanreotide or ocreotide are often given as part of treatment. This seems to have made a significant impact, with survival rates of NETs improving 3-fold since the introduction of somatostatin-analogue treatment.

SSTR1 and SSTR4 are potential targets for the treatment of Alzheimer's disease.
