= Small intestine neuroendocrine tumor =

- Specialty: Gastroenterology/oncology

A small intestine neuroendocrine tumor is a carcinoid in the distal small intestine or the proximal large intestine. It is a relatively rare cancer and is diagnosed in approximately 1/100000 people every year. In recent decades the incidence has increased. The prognosis is comparatively good with a median survival of more than 8 years. The disease was named by Siegfried Oberndorfer, a German pathologist, in 1907.

== Signs and symptoms ==
A large fraction of cases are diagnosed after routine surgery for bowel obstruction. Others may be diagnosed incidentally, or after investigation for carcinoid syndrome. The tumor typically produces serotonin, Tachykinin peptides and other substances, which cause flushing, tachycardia, diarrhea and in some cases fibrosis of the heart valves.

Neuroendocrine tumours are classified as functional or non-functional depending on whether hormone secretion produces clinical symptoms or not. In patients with metastatic small-intestinal NETs (SI-NETs), carcinoid syndrome is common and is characterised by diarrhoea, episodic flushing, bronchospasm, and often carcinoid heart disease leading to right-sided valvular dysfunction. Patients with non-functional SI-NETs are frequently asymptomatic or may present with non-specific symptoms, resulting in metastatic disease at diagnosis in approximately 27–73% of cases.

There are often several small and highly fibrotic tumors present in the intestine. The tumors often spread to the mesenteries and the liver.

== Cause ==
Familial clustering of the disease, with several relatives being diagnosed may occur. Relatives of patients have an increased risk of developing the disease. Risk factors associated with an increased incidence of small-intestinal neuroendocrine neoplasms (SI- NENs) include smoking, a possible family history of cancer, and a history of gallbladder disease or cholecystectomy. Each of these factors has been linked to an approximately 1.5-fold higher risk of developing SI-NENs.

=== Genetics ===
The tumors often harbour loss of chromosome 18q. Mutations in CDKN1B are present in approximately 8% of cases. In terms of transcritpomic analysis, small intestinal neurodendocrine tumours present 4 gene expression sub-clusters named Vesicular (Ves), Immune, Epithelial (Epi) and Mesenchymal (Mes). This last signature correlates with a very poor prognosis for the patient. The infitration of cancer associated fibroblasts is particularly abundant.

== Treatment ==
The treatment traditionally consists of a combination of medical and surgical treatment. Somatostatin analogues and Interferon decrease the secretion of hormones and the resulting symptoms. Radionuclide therapy with 177-Lutetium-DOTA-Octreotate increases progression-free survival.

Traditionally, the primary tumor has been surgically removed even in the case of metastatic disease, although this was in 2017 shown not to improve survival in asymptomatic patients.
