= C33H36N4O3 =

The molecular formula C_{33}H_{36}N_{4}O_{3} (molar mass: 536.676 g/mol) may refer to:

- Mozenavir (DMP-450)
- L-817818
