= Suksin Lee =

- Born: 6 October 1897 (Note: Jeong writes that Lee was born in the year 1896. Yeh gives Lee's birth year as 1897.); P'yŏngannam-do, Joseon Korea
- Died: 12 December 1944 (aged 47); Seoul, Korea
- Education: Seoul National University; University of Berlin; Kyoto University
- Scientific career
- Fields: biochemistry, nutrition
- Workplaces: University of Berlin; Seoul National University; Yonsei University; Ewha University

Suksin Lee (Korean: 이석신; Hanja: 李錫申; 6 October 1896/7 – 12 December 1944) was a Korean biochemist and physician. He is considered a pioneer of biochemistry in Korea, having been the first Korean to obtain a Ph.D. and to hold a full-time professorship in that field. His studies of glucose metabolism and the chemical composition of common foods contributed to the scientific analysis of nutrition in the Korean diet.

== Biography ==
=== Early life and education ===
Suksin Lee was born in P'yŏngannam-do, Korea, the son of I Myŏngse and a woman of the Koksan Kang family. He earned his medical degree from Kyŏngsŏng Medical College (now Seoul National University) in 1921, and obtained his medical license in August of that year. After graduation, he studied pathology for several months at Tokyo Imperial University in Japan. He then traveled to Germany in 1922 to pursue additional studies.

After completing preliminary language instruction and various coursework in chemistry and physiological chemistry at the Friedrich Wilhelm University of Berlin, he earned a doctorate of medicine in 1926. Lee's inaugural dissertation, Ueber Glykolyse, was a study of inorganic phosphates during blood glycolysis. His thesis advisors at the time included Otto Lubarsch of the Chemistry Department at the Pathological Institute, University of Berlin.

While in his final year of studies, Lee obtained a position as a research assistant at a national hospital in Berlin, where he worked until 1927. During this time he published and co-published several papers on the effects of photosensitive substances on glucose metabolism and cellular respiration.

=== Scientific career ===
Returning to his native Korea, he began studies of the staple Korean diet and its effects on metabolism as a research assistant at Kyŏngsŏng Medical College in February 1928. He was appointed an instructor of physiology in the department of biochemistry of Severance Union Medical College (now Yonsei University College of Medicine) and an adjunct instructor of dietetics at Ewha Womans University College of Medicine.

In 1932, Suksin Lee was the first Korean to earn a Ph.D. in biochemistry for his thesis, A Study on the Eating Habits of Koreans, presented to Kyoto Imperial University on the nutrition and metabolism of prisoners in Korea. Among his advisers at the time was Professor Sato of Keijo Imperial University.

He was then appointed full-time professor of biochemistry in 1933 at Severance Union Medical College, the first Korean to hold such a position. He continued to lead the department, later serving as Severance's Dean of Student Affairs, until his death aged approximately 47 of a cerebral hemorrhage on 12 December 1944.

== Contributions ==
As the first Ph.D. and full-time professor of biochemistry in Korea, Lee contributed to the establishment of biochemistry as a newly organized field of study in Korea.

He began with a study of glycolysis. In the late 1920s, the role of phosphorylated compounds in glycolysis had not yet been fully explained. Lee's work touched on early aspects of intermediary carbohydrate metabolism, which was also the subject of Nobel Prize-winning research by Otto Fritz Meyerhof, Otto Heinrich Warburg, and Hans Adolf Krebs.

Lee maintained an interest in factors affecting glucose metabolism upon his return to Korea, where he continued his research with published studies of the Korean diet. Building upon work begun in 1928, he investigated the problem of identifying and quantifying the nutritional elements of the staple Korean diet and its effects on metabolism. He identified nutritional sources in these foods for the healthy development of Korean children and adults during the Japanese occupation of Korea.

In addition to teaching and editing, Lee authored and co-authored at least 10 scientific papers and articles in several languages throughout his brief career. He did all of this despite working under conditions of widespread rationing at the end of World War II.

== Legacy ==
In 2014 and 2016 the Department of Biochemistry and Molecular Biology, Yonsei University College of Medicine, hosted academic symposiums to commemorate his life's work.

A Special Memorial Exhibition was also held in 2015 at the Dong-Eun Museum of Medical Science in Seoul, Korea. The exhibit included a collection of papers left by the late Suksin Lee.

== Bibliography ==
- Jeong, GC (1985). Pioneers of Korean Healthcare. Seoul: Dong-Bang Eui-Seo Press. pp. 627–635.
- Yeh, Byung-Il (2017). "Suksin Lee, the First Ph.D. and Full-Time Professor of Biochemistry in Korea, Editorial Series: Frontiers of Medicine in Korea". Yonsei Medical Journal. 58 (3): 475–478. doi:10.3349/ymj.2017.58.3.475. PMC 5368130. PMID 28332350.
- Lee, Suksin (1926). Ueber Glykolyse (Dr. med.) (in German). Friedrich-Wilhelms Universität zu Berlin.
- 李, 錫申 (1932). 朝鮮人ノ習慣食ニ就テノ研究, レポートI, II (Ph.D.) (in Japanese). 京都帝国大学.
- Lipmann F (1975). "Reminiscences of Embden's formulation of the Embden-Meyerhof cycle". Mol. Cell. Biochem. 6 (3): 171–5. doi:10.1007/bf01732075. PMID 165399. S2CID 23870545.Lipmann, F. (1 July 1976).
- "The Journal of Severance Union Medical College". 3. 1935–1937.
