= Somatostatin family =

Somatostatin/cortistatin family

Identifiers
- Symbol: Somatostatin
- Pfam: PF03002
- InterPro: IPR004250
Available protein structures:
- PDB: 1p2wA:99-116 IPR004250 PF03002 (ECOD; PDBsum)
- AlphaFold: IPR004250; PF03002

The somatostatin family is a protein family with somatostatin as titular member, a hormone which inhibits the release of the pituitary somatotropin (growth hormone) and inhibits the release of glucagon and insulin from the pancreas of fasted animals. Cortistatin is a cortical neuropeptide with neuronal depressant and sleep-modulating properties.

== Human proteins from this family ==
- Cortistatin (CORT)
- Somatostatin (SST)
