= Zavolosotine =

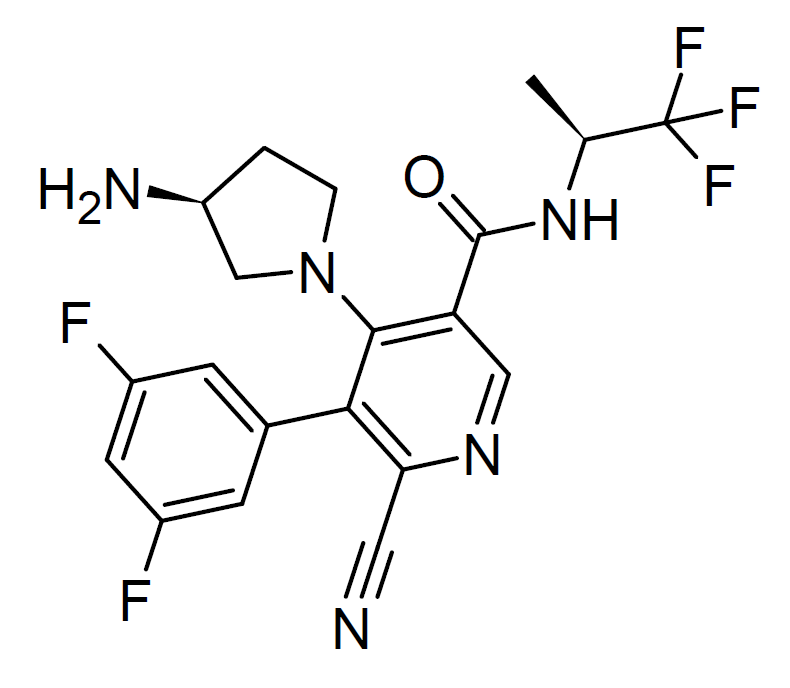

Clinical data
- Other names: CRN 04777, CRN-04777

Identifiers
- IUPAC name: 4-[(3S)-3-aminopyrrolidin-1-yl]-6-cyano-5-(3,5-difluorophenyl)-N-[(2S)-1,1,1-trifluoropropan-2-yl]pyridine-3-carboxamide
- CAS Number: 2604416-66-0
- PubChem CID: 156065422
- IUPHAR/BPS: 13224
- DrugBank: DB21531
- UNII: 275EAX4XXX

Chemical and physical data
- Formula: C_{20}H_{18}F_{5}N_{5}O
- Molar mass: 439.390 g·mol^{−1}
- 3D model (JSmol): Interactive image
- SMILES: C[C@@H](C(F)(F)F)NC(=O)C1=CN=C(C(=C1N2CC[C@@H](C2)N)C3=CC(=CC(=C3)F)F)C#N
- InChI: InChI=1S/C20H18F5N5O/c1-10(20(23,24)25)29-19(31)15-8-28-16(7-26)17(11-4-12(21)6-13(22)5-11)18(15)30-3-2-14(27)9-30/h4-6,8,10,14H,2-3,9,27H2,1H3,(H,29,31)/t10-,14-/m0/s1; Key:HQIIZMSUOLJYSO-HZMBPMFUSA-N

Zavolosotine (CRN04777) is a chemical compound which acts as an agonist at somatostatin receptor 5. It inhibits insulin release and glucagon secretion, and has potential applications in the treatment of diabetes.
