= Theodor Thierfelder =

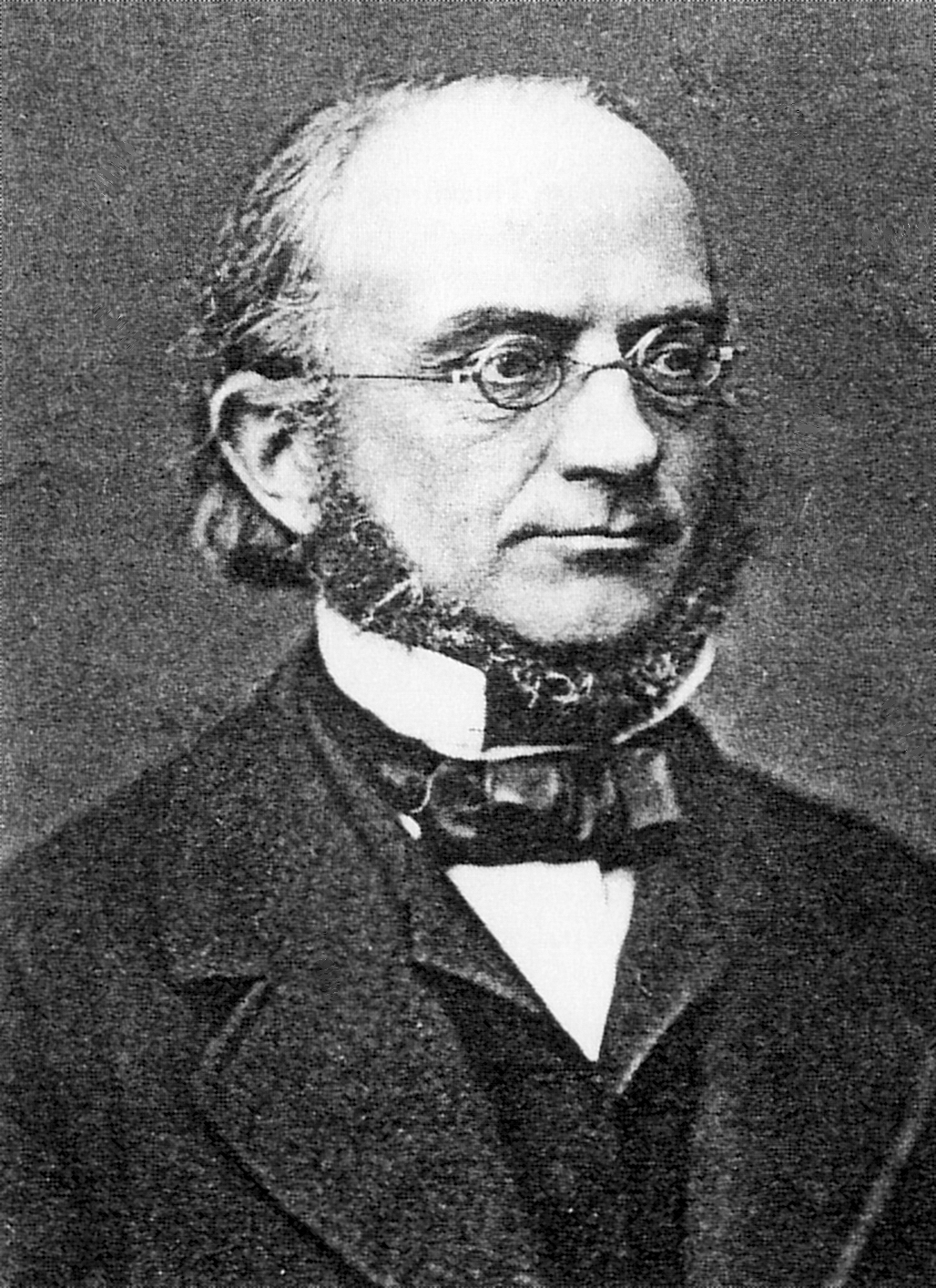
Theodor Thierfelder (1824-1904)

Benjamin Theodor Thierfelder (10 December 1824 – 7 March 1904) was a German internist born in Meissen. He is remembered for contributions made in research of Fieberkurve (temperature patterns) involving typhoid fever.

In 1848 he earned his medical doctorate from the University of Leipzig, where in 1851 he became a member of the medical staff, and an assistant to Carl Reinhold August Wunderlich (1815-1877). In 1855 he was appointed an associate professor at the University of Rostock, where from 1856 to 1901 he served as a full professor (pathological anatomy until 1866 and internal medicine).

In 1860 he was named Obermedizinalrat and a member of the "Grand Ducal medical commission".

He was son-in-law to classical philologist Franz Volkmar Fritzsche (1806-1887), and was the brother of pathologist Albert Thierfelder (1842-1908), who also was a professor at the University of Rostock.

== Literature ==
- Grewolls, Grete (2011). Wer war wer in Mecklenburg und Vorpommern. Das Personenlexikon (in German). Rostock: Hinstorff Verlag. p. 10069. ISBN 978-3-356-01301-6.
