= Robert Rössle =

German pathologist

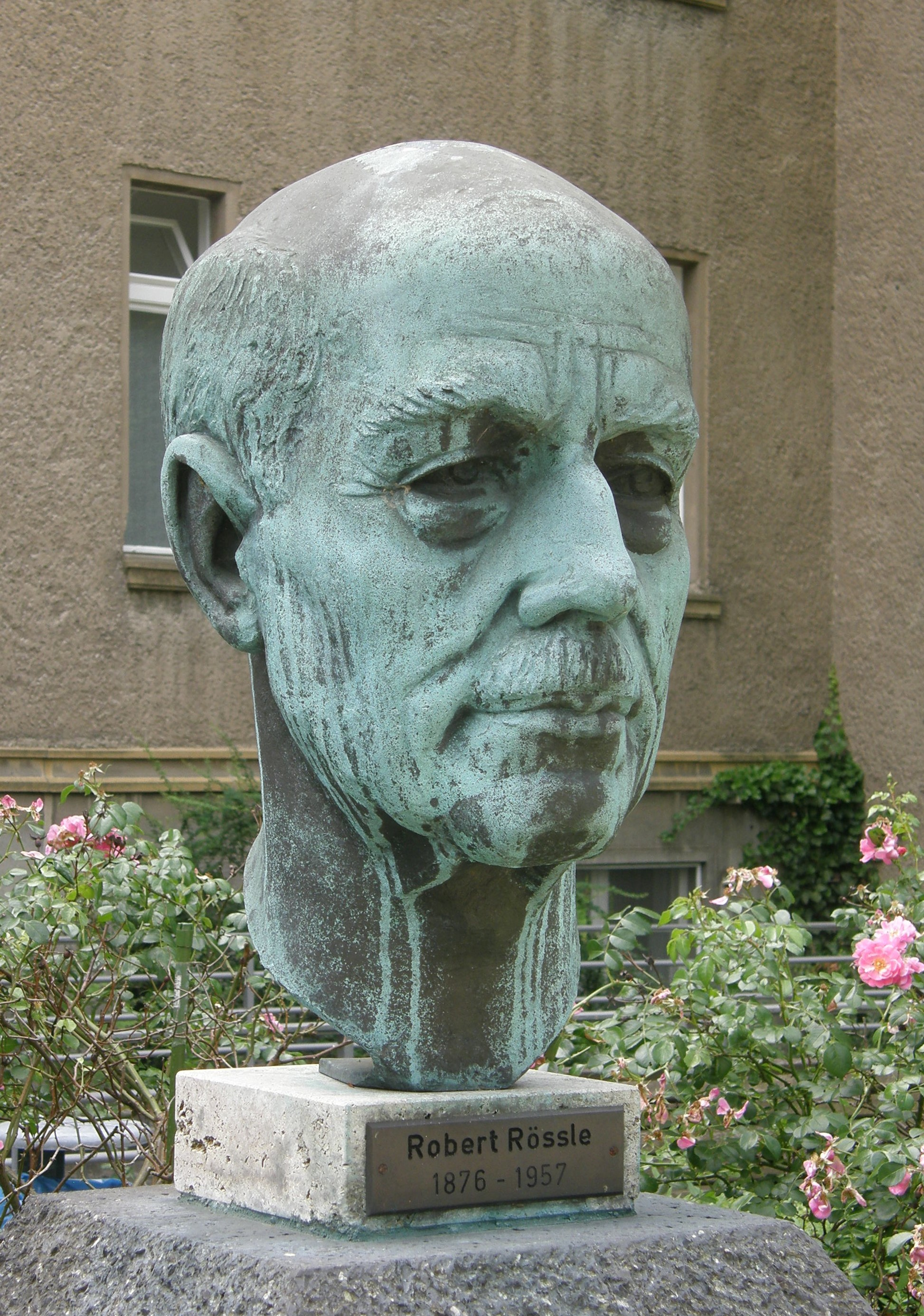
Bust of Rössle in Berlin

Robert Rössle (August 19, 1876 – November 21, 1956) was a German pathologist. He was born in Augsburg and died in Berlin.

In 1900, Rössle received his medical doctorate at the Ludwig-Maximilians-Universität München, and went to work at the Pathological Institute of Kiel University. From 1911 to 1921, he was a professor of general pathology and pathological anatomy at the University of Jena, and from 1922 until 1929, he held a similar position at the University of Basel. In 1929, he succeeded Otto Lubarsch (1860–1933) in the department of pathology at the Charité in Berlin, where he remained until 1948.

Rössle performed pathological investigations in several facets of medicine, including liver disease, allergies, inflammation, cellular pathology and geriatrics. He described aspects associated with a form of secondary biliary cirrhosis that was once referred to as "Hanot–Rössle syndrome" (named in conjunction with French physician Victor Charles Hanot (1844–1896)).

Rössle published over 300 medical papers, and was editor of 39 volumes of Virchow's Archiv für Pathologische Anatomie und Physiologie und für Klinische Medicin (now: Virchows Archiv). Today, the Robert-Rössle-Hospital and Tumor Institute is named in his honor. It is located at the Max-Delbrück-Center of Molecular Medicine at the Humboldt University of Berlin.
