= Otto Lubarsch =

German pathologist and academic (1860–1933)

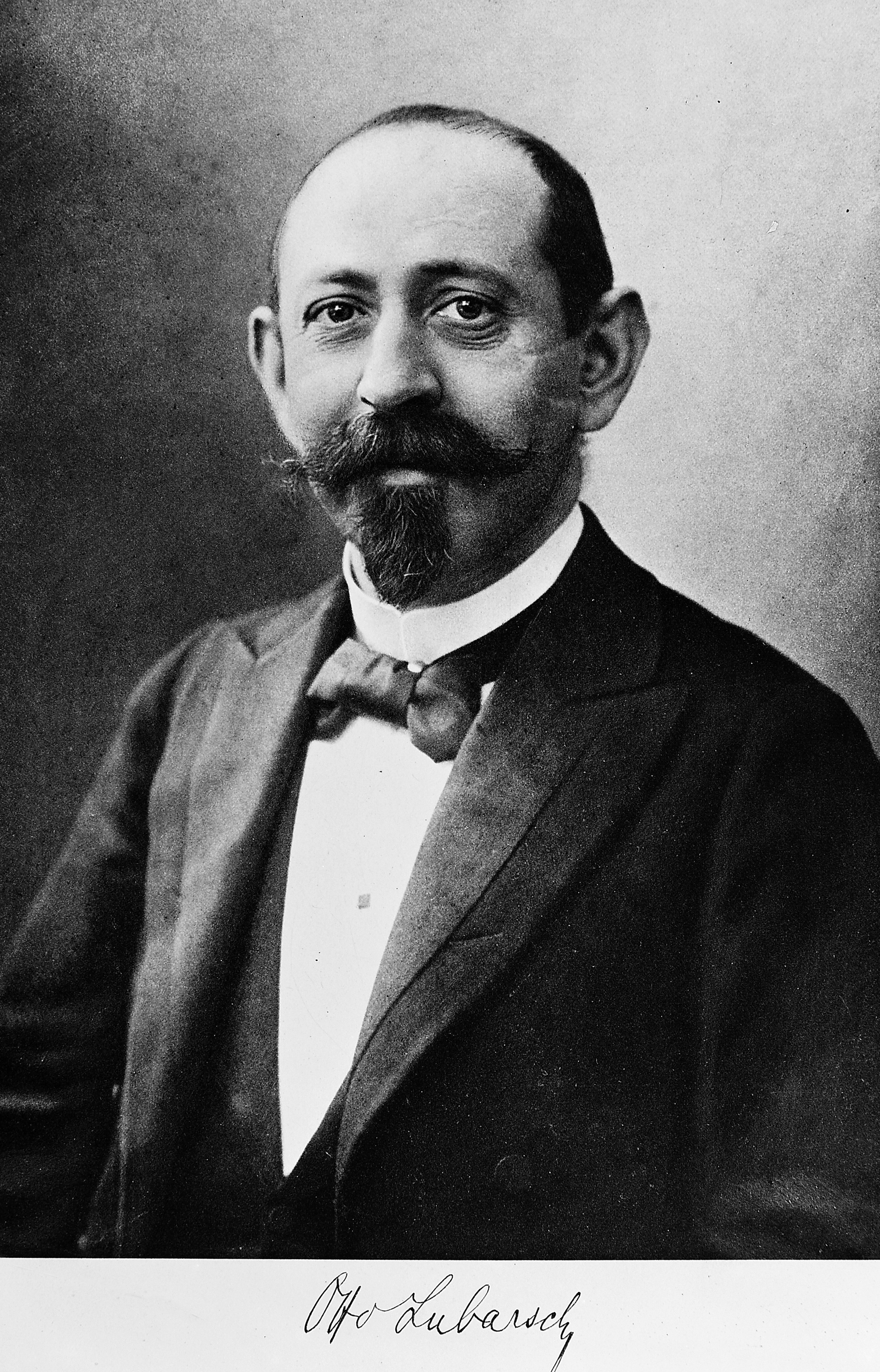

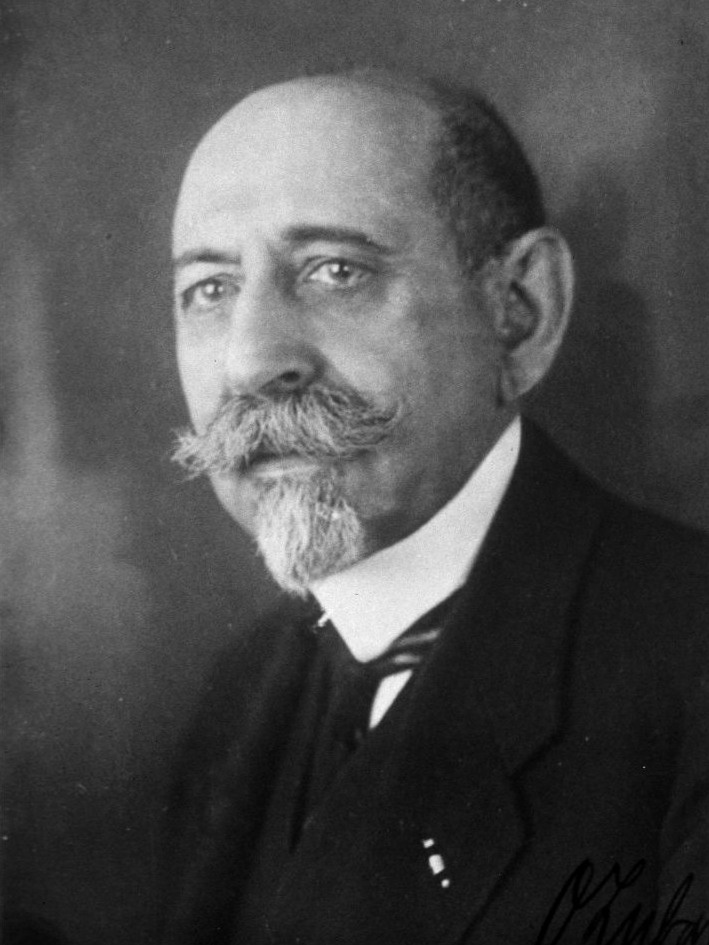

Otto Lubarsch (4 January 1860 – 1 April 1933) was a German pathologist and academic who was a native of Berlin. Among other contributions to medical knowledge, Lubarsch provided the first detailed description of carcinoid tumors.

== Academic career ==
He originally studied philosophy and natural sciences in Leipzig and Heidelberg, and later on, earned his medical degree at the University of Strasbourg in 1883. Subsequently, he became an assistant to Hugo Kronecker at the Institute of Physiology in Bern, and afterwards served as an assistant at pathological institutes in Giessen, Breslau and Zurich. In 1891 he became first assistant to Albert Thierfelder at the pathological institute of the University of Rostock, where in 1894 he was appointed an associate professor of pathological anatomy and general pathology. In 1905 he became director of the institute of pathology and bacteriology at Zwickau, later serving as a professor in Düsseldorf (from 1907), Kiel (from 1913), and Berlin (1917–1929).

=== Contributions ===
In 1888 Lubarsch provided the first detailed description of carcinoid tumors during autopsies of two male "patients", however it wouldn't be until 1907 that the term karzinoid was applied by Siegfried Oberndorfer. Lubarsch also discovered tiny crystals in the epithelial cells of the testis that resemble sperm crystals. These structures are now known as "Lubarsch' crystals".

With Friedrich Henke (1868–1943), he was editor of the Henke-Lubarsch Handbuch der Speziellen Pathologischen Anatomie und Histologie, which was a massive reference book containing information germane to pathology. It was founded in 1924, and produced over a forty-year span. After World War II, it was continued and edited by Robert Rössle. With veterinarian Robert von Ostertag, he collaborated on the journal Ergebnisse der allgemeinen Pathologie und pathologischen Anatomie der Menschen und der Tiere.

== Associated eponyms ==
Lubarsch' crystals
Tiny crystals in the epithelial cells of the testis that resemble sperm crystals.
Lubarsch–Pick syndrome
A combination of systematized amyloidosis with macroglossia. Named in conjunction with pathologist Ludwig Pick (1868–1944).
