= Cortistatin =

Cortistatin can refer to:

- Cortistatin (neuropeptide), a peptide hormone
- Cortistatins, a class of steroids applied against angiogenesis
