= Hachiro Sugimoto =

Japanese chemist and pharmacologist

Hachiro Sugimoto (杉本 八郎, Sugimoto Hachirō) is a Japanese chemist and pharmacologist, known for his discovery of Donepezil.

== Research ==
Sugimoto's research on E2020 (now called Donepezil), an acetylcholinesterase inhibitor, first began at Eisai's Tsukuba Research Laboratories in 1983, because his mother suffered from dementia. At that time, there was a hypothesis suggested that acetylcholines were closely linked to abnormal decreases in memory function in patients with Alzheimer's disease. His research group was finally able to successfully create Donepezil with a promising enough profile for the compound to become a drug candidate.

== Biography ==
Sugimoto was born as the eighth child among nine children in a downtown section of Tokyo in 1943, and joined Eisai, a Japanese pharmaceutical company. While working for Eisai, he graduated from Chuo University in 1969 and obtained his doctorate in pharmacology at Hiroshima University in 2002. In 2003, he retired from Eisai, and became Professor in the Graduate School of Pharmaceutical Sciences, Kyoto University.

== Recognition ==
For his achievement, Sugimoto received the Award of Science from Eisai in October 1993, the Award of Engineering from the Pharmaceutical Society of Japan in March 1998, the Special Galien Prize in the UK in April 1998, the Chemistry-Bio Tsukuba Award in May 1998, and the Imperial Award for Invention in June 2002
