= Albert Thierfelder =

German pathologist

Ferdinand Albert Thierfelder (12 December 1842 – 22 January 1908) was a German pathologist born in Meissen. He was the son of city physician (Stadtphysikus) Johann Gottlieb Thierfelder (1799–1867), and was a younger brother to internist Theodor Thierfelder (1824–1904).

He studied medicine at the University of Rostock and University of Leipzig, earning his doctorate in 1870 with a dissertation on sweat gland adenoma, Ein Fall von Schweissdrüsen-Adenom. He spent several years as an assistant at the institute of pathology in Leipzig, and from 1876 to 1908 was a full professor of anatomic pathology in Rostock. One of his better known assistants in Rostock was pathologist Otto Lubarsch (1860–1934).

In 1884/85 he was chairman of Naturforschenden Gesellschaft (Natural History Society of Rostock).

He was the author of Atlas der Pathologischen Histologie (Atlas of pathological histology), published in seven parts from 1872 to 1881:

- 1 Lfg. "Pathologische Histologie der Luftwege und der Lunge". 1872.
- 2 Lfg. "Pathologie Histologie des Verdauungscanals (Mundhöhle, Rachen, Speiseröhre, Magen und Darm)". 1873.
- 3 Lfg. "Pathologische Histologie der Leber, des Pankreas und der Speicheldrüsen". 1874.
- 4 Lfg. "Pathologishe Histologie der serösen Haüte und Gelenke". 1875.
- 5 Lfg. "Pathologische Histologie der Knochen und des Periosts". 1876.
- 6 and 7 Lfg. "Pathologische Histologie des Herzens und der Blutgefasse (Myocardium, Endocardium Arterien, Venen und Capillaren)". 1881.
