= Carcinoid syndrome =

Medical effects of neuroendocrine tumors releasing substances into the blood

- Specialty: Endocrinology, oncology

Carcinoid syndrome is a paraneoplastic syndrome comprising the signs and symptoms that occur secondary to neuroendocrine tumors (formerly known as carcinoid tumors). The syndrome is caused by neuroendocrine tumors most often found in the gut releasing biologically active substances into the blood causing symptoms such as flushing and diarrhea, and less frequently, heart failure, vomiting and bronchoconstriction.

== Signs and symptoms ==
Possible symptoms of the carcinoid syndrome

The carcinoid syndrome occurs in approximately 10% of all neuroendocrine tumors or about 30–40% of more advanced/well developed neuroendocrine tumors. The biologically active substances that are released by the tumors cause the symptoms of the carcinoid syndrome. These substances act on the vessels to produce the symptoms of the carcinoid syndrome.

- Flushing: The most common finding is flushing of the skin, usually of the head and the upper part of thorax in about 85% of people. The flushing may come and go and may also be triggered by various factors such as diet (i.e. alcohol intake), activity, and stress.
- Diarrhea: The second most common finding occurring in about 80% of people. It may also be associated with abdominal cramping and pain.
- Bronchoconstriction: A relatively rare symptom affects about 15% of those having carcinoid syndrome and often accompanies flushing, sneezing, and shortness of breath.
- Heart disease: About 60–70% of those affected by carcinoid syndrome develop cardiac complications. This mainly affects the right side of the heart causing fibrosis of the tricuspid and pulmonic valves. This may be heard as a murmur and may contribute to fatigue.

Less common symptoms include malabsorption (leading to pellagra), fatigue, muscle loss, and cognitive impairment. Late complications may include mesenteric and retroperitoneal fibroses as well.

== Pathophysiology ==
Serotonin

Tryptophan

The carcinoid syndrome occurs secondary to neuroendocrine tumors. These tumors occur mostly in the gut and less commonly in the lungs, but may also occur in other places in the body such as the pancreas, kidneys, and other organs. Neuroendocrine tumors produce several biologically active substances, mainly amines and peptides. There are over 40 substances known to be secreted by these tumors but the exact effect of each and their contribution to the carcinoid syndrome is unknown. The most common substances found to be released and contribute to the syndrome include serotonin, histamine, tachykinins, kallikrein, and prostaglandins with the greatest contribution appearing to be from serotonin. The symptoms of the carcinoid syndrome result from the action of these substances largely on the blood vessels. These biologic substances are often metabolized and inactivated by the liver in a process known as first pass metabolism. This is why carcinoid syndrome most often occurs in patients whom the neuroendocrine tumor has metastasized to the liver, which allows the substances to bypass the first pass metabolism. Neuroendocrine tumors arising in the bronchi may be associated with manifestations of carcinoid syndrome without liver metastases because their biologically active products reach the systemic circulation before passing through the liver and being metabolized.

Tryptophan metabolism is altered in the carcinoid syndrome. With neuroendocrine tumors, there is a shift in conversion of tryptophan to serotonin from the normal 1% to as high as 70%. Increased amounts of serotonin lead to increased gut motility causing the diarrhea seen in carcinoid syndrome. Increased amounts of serotonin can also cause the flushing seen as the main symptom of carcinoid syndrome. Tryptophan is also needed for niacin synthesis which can be a cause for pellagra associated with carcinoid syndrome. In the pulmonary neuroendocrine tumors or metastases, histamine release and kallikrein metabolism are the vasoactive mediators of flushing and the other symptoms of carcinoid syndrome.

=== Carcinoid crisis ===
Carcinoid crisis is an extreme exacerbation of the carcinoid syndrome. This results from excessive release of amines by the neuroendocrine tumors. It is largely a result of stressful procedures such as anesthesia, surgery, or radiation treatment. Symptoms of carcinoid crisis include flushing, hypotension, arrhythmia and bronchospasm.

=== Carcinoid heart disease ===
Carcinoid heart disease is the result of valvular damage related to the vasoactive substances released by the neuroendocrine tumor reaching the right side of the heart. This mainly affects the right side of the heart unless there is anomalous circulation (i.e. patent foramen ovale) because the lungs will metabolize the substances released by the tumor similar to how the liver will. After initial tissue injury around the valves, plaque will develop and fibrosis will occur, possibly mediated by excess serotonin.

== Diagnosis ==
With a certain degree of clinical suspicion, the most useful initial test is the 24-hour urine levels of 5-HIAA (5-hydroxyindoleacetic acid), the end product of serotonin metabolism. Chromogramin A, a glycoprotein released by neuroendocrine tumors, can be used to detect non-secreting tumors.

=== Imaging ===
Imaging studies should be largely focused on the abdomen and pelvis because the neuroendocrine tumors causing the carcinoid syndrome largely arise in the gut. Nuclear medicine gamma camera imaging that utilizes radioactive somatostatin analogues such as indium-111 pentetreotide are used to localize the tumor. PET scan can also be used to find the primary tumor site. Bronchoscopy with biopsy can performed if there is evidence of a pulmonary tumor. For patients with serotonin elevated 5x the upper limit of normal or more, an echocardiogram is recommended for evaluation of carcinoid heart disease.

=== Differential diagnosis ===
Other conditions similar to the carcinoid syndrome that should be considered include:

- Irritable bowel syndrome
- Celiac disease
- Ogilvie syndrome

== Treatment ==
Treatment of the carcinoid syndrome is focused on controlling the proliferation of the primary tumor and symptomatic control of the symptoms with somatostatin analogues octreotide or lanreotide. These analogues can help control the growth of the tumor itself and the associated symptoms of the carcinoid syndrome. In patients whose symptoms are refractory to initial doses, increasing the dose or switching to another analogue, such as pasireotide may be effective. In patients who continue to be refractory, mTOR inhibitors such as everolimus. The TPH inhibitor telotristat ethyl may be useful in controlling diarrhea associated with the carcinoid syndrome.

Peptide directed radiotherapy (PRRT) is another alternative treatment for patients who failed somatostain analogue therapy. This method uses radioactive somatostatin analogues such as ^{177}Lu-Dotatate or ^{90}Y-Edotreotide to target tumors directly. These therapies are effective for metastatic disease but studies have been limited to about 6-month time periods.

Cytoreductive surgery performed chemically with ^{131}metaiodobenzylguanidine (^{131}I-MIBG) may also control symptoms starting around 6–15 months post procedure and lasting as long as 39 months. There are also procedures that target the liver directly such as radiofrequency ablation or radioembolization that deliver targeted therapy directly to the liver through special catheters. This is especially useful for patients with liver metastases.

=== Carcinoid heart disease ===
The most important aspect of treating carcinoid heart disease is detecting its presence with echocardiography, likely with color doppler. Treatment consists of the same treatment as patients with heart failure with definitive treatment being surgical valve repair or replacement.

=== Uncertainties ===
Disease progression is difficult to ascertain because the disease can metastasize anywhere in the body and can be too small to identify with any current technology. Markers of the condition such as chromogranin-A are imperfect indicators of disease progression.

== Epidemiology ==
The incidence of neuroendocrine tumors in the US lies somewhere from 2.7 to 4.3 per 100,000 people, and appears to be increasing over time. The incidence of the carcinoid syndrome is about 0.27 per 100,000 people in the US, about 10% of all people with neuroendocrine tumors. There does not appear to be any variance by gender, although patients of African-American ethnicity appear to be affected by the carcinoid syndrome more often.

== Nonhuman animals ==
The carcinoid syndrome can affect other animals similarly to humans. Similarly to humans, the carcinoid syndrome is due to neuroendocrine tumors that arise mainly from the bowel but also from other organs. Common signs in animals include vomiting, diarrhea, and weight loss but other symptoms that are more common in humans such as flushing, hypotension and diarrhea can also occur. Similar to humans, the cause of the carcinoid syndrome is the release of bioactive substances such as serotonin and histamine.

== See also ==
- Carcinoid
- Neuroendocrine tumor
- Small intestine neuroendocrine tumor
- Kulchitsky cells
- Apudoma
