= FK962 =

Somatostatin release enhancer

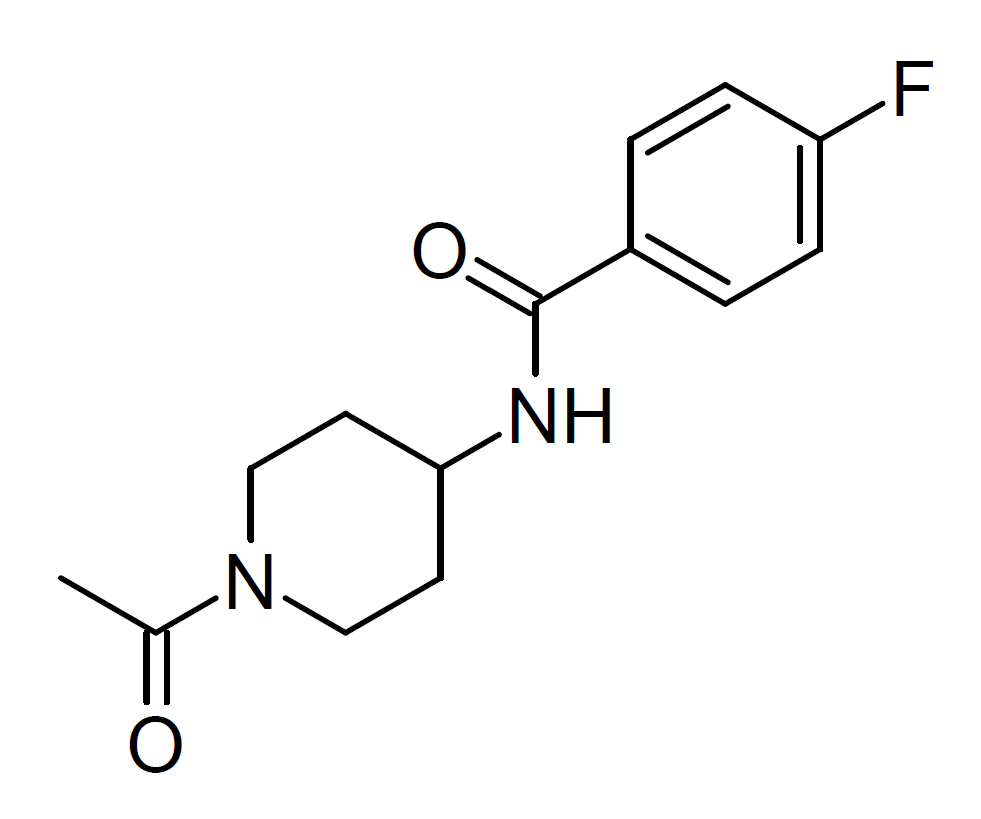

Identifiers
- IUPAC name: N-(1-acetylpiperidin-4-yl)-4-fluorobenzamide
- CAS Number: 283167-06-6
- PubChem CID: 9816738
- ChemSpider: 7992488
- UNII: 25J7VT36F9
- ChEMBL: ChEMBL4303387

Chemical and physical data
- Formula: C_{14}H_{17}FN_{2}O_{2}
- Molar mass: 264.300 g·mol^{−1}
- 3D model (JSmol): Interactive image
- SMILES: CC(=O)N1CCC(CC1)NC(=O)C2=CC=C(C=C2)F
- InChI: InChI=1S/C14H17FN2O2/c1-10(18)17-8-6-13(7-9-17)16-14(19)11-2-4-12(15)5-3-11/h2-5,13H,6-9H2,1H3,(H,16,19); Key:VBHVOHJOTMCSBQ-UHFFFAOYSA-N

FK962 is a compound which acts as an enhancer of somatostatin release. It stimulates nerve growth and neurite elongation, and has been researched in animal models for potential applications in the treatment of conditions such as Alzheimer's disease and retinal neuropathy.

== See also ==
- Octreotide
- Pasireotide
- Sunifiram (structural similarity)
