= Neuronostatin =

Human Hormone

Identifiers
- Symbol: NST
- IUPHAR
- CAS number: 1096485-24-3
- HGNC: 11329
- OMIM: referenced 182450, referenced
- RefSeq: associated with SST 6750, associated with SST

Other data
- Locus: Chr. 3 q27.3

Neuronostatin (abbreviated as NST) is a peptide hormone that may regulate portions of the endocrine system via interactions with G protein coupled receptor.

Neuronostatin is an alternative cleavage product of the preproprotein encoded by the somatostatin (SST) gene. Proteolytic processing of this precursor yields two distinct neuropeptides, with the specific products determined by tissue-dependent post-translational mechanisms. Neuronostatin is a linear, C-terminally amidated peptide that exists in forms of 13 or 19 amino acids in length. In contrast, somatostatin, another peptide derived from the same precursor, is structurally distinct, forming cyclic peptides of 14 or 28 amino acids. These differences arise from variations in cleavage sites and subsequent peptide modification, resulting in neuropeptides with unique amino acid sequences and conformations. Neuronostatin and somatostatin also differ in their biological distribution and relative abundance. Various tissues have been shown to express differing ratios of these peptides, reflecting tissue-specific regulation of SST gene processing and suggesting distinct physiological roles for each cleavage product.

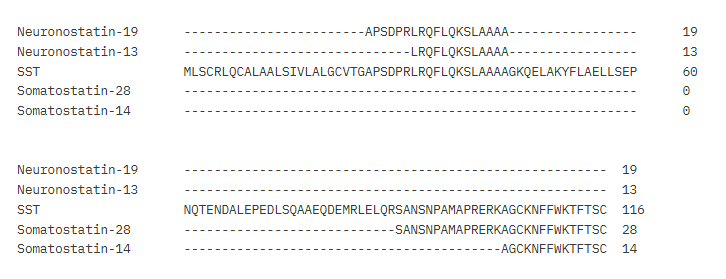
Amino acid sequence alignment chart of SST and its cleavage products.

Neuronostatin has been associated with impaired memory, increased Aβ presence and aggravated Aβ pathologies, kidney function and breast/prostate cancer metastasis

== Functions ==
Neuronostatin signals through the G protein Couple receptor 107(GPR107).

=== Neural tissues ===
Neuronostatin binds to monomeric Aβ1-42 and increases the presence of Aβ plaques within the cortex and hippocampus of APP/PS1 mice. Neuronostatin also affects proliferation rates and metabolism within neuronal cells via activation of GPR107 and PKA

=== Peripheral tissues ===
Neuronostatin/GPR107 signaling is associated with regulation of COL4 within both breast cancer and kidney tissues, where Neuronostatin/GPR107 reduces expression of COL4. In breast cancer, this reduction in COL4 generates enlarged pores within the extracellular matrix that allow for increase breast cancer migration and proliferation, leading to increased rates of metastasis. Neuronostatin and GPR107 have similarly been linked to increased rates of migration within prostate cancer. Within kidney tissues, Neuronostatin/GPR107 reduces thickening/remodeling of the glomerular basement membrane by reducing COL4 deposition and improves features of diabetic nephropathy

Additional features of Neuronostatin signaling include regulation of cardiomyocytes; Neuronostatin depresses cardiomyocyte function by affecting [Ca^{2+}]_{i} responses and regulating the expression of calcium regulating proteins
