= L-817818 =

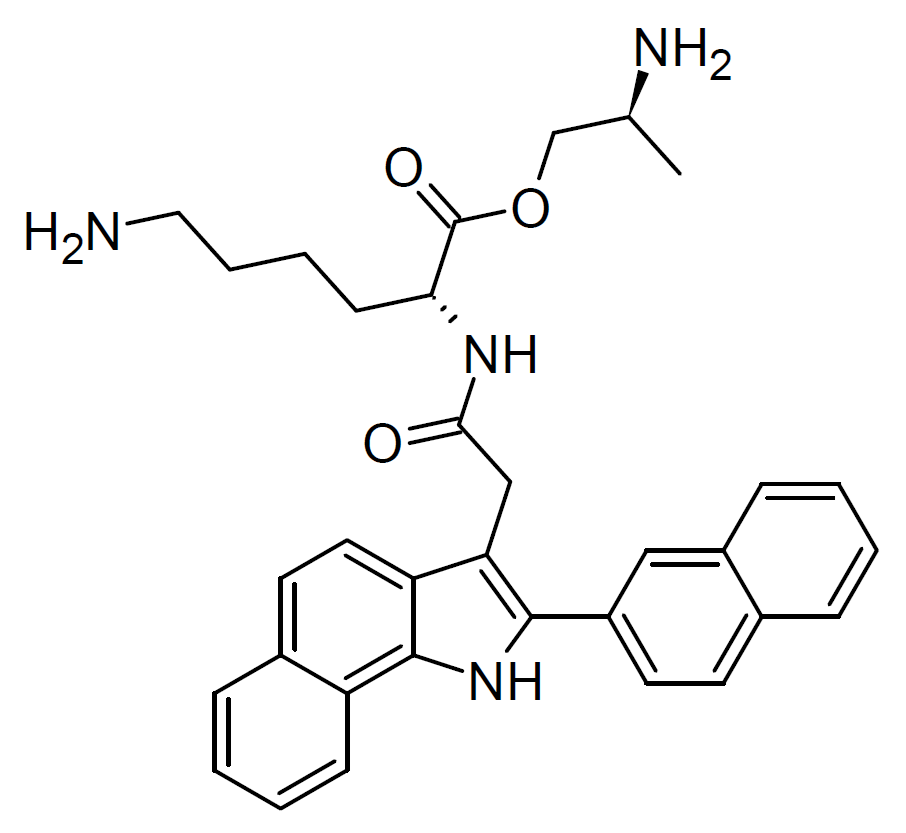

Identifiers
- IUPAC name: [(2S)-2-aminopropyl] (2S)-6-amino-2-[[2-(2-naphthalen-2-yl-1H-benzo[g]indol-3-yl)acetyl]amino]hexanoate
- CAS Number: 217480-27-8
- PubChem CID: 5311375
- IUPHAR/BPS: 2016
- ChemSpider: 4470868
- ChEBI: CHEBI:177199
- ChEMBL: ChEMBL252764

Chemical and physical data
- Formula: C_{33}H_{36}N_{4}O_{3}
- Molar mass: 536.676 g·mol^{−1}
- 3D model (JSmol): Interactive image
- SMILES: C[C@@H](COC(=O)[C@H](CCCCN)NC(=O)CC1=C(NC2=C1C=CC3=CC=CC=C32)C4=CC5=CC=CC=C5C=C4)N
- InChI: InChI=1S/C33H36N4O3/c1-21(35)20-40-33(39)29(12-6-7-17-34)36-30(38)19-28-27-16-15-23-9-4-5-11-26(23)32(27)37-31(28)25-14-13-22-8-2-3-10-24(22)18-25/h2-5,8-11,13-16,18,21,29,37H,6-7,12,17,19-20,34-35H2,1H3,(H,36,38)/t21-,29-/m0/s1; Key:NFVRGDRCCNEGBS-LGGPFLRQSA-N

L-817818 is a chemical compound which acts as an agonist at somatostatin receptor 5. It has neuroprotective effects in animal models and modulates insulin release.
