= Somatostatin =

Peptide hormone that regulates the endocrine system

SST
Available structures
PDB	Ortholog search: PDBe RCSB
PDB	List of PDB id codes 2MI1

Identifiers
- Aliases: SST, SMST, somatostatin, Somatostatin, Somatostatin, SST1
- External IDs: OMIM: 182450; MGI: 98326; HomoloGene: 819; GeneCards: SST; OMA:SST - orthologs

Gene location (Human)
Chr.	Chromosome 3 (human)
Band	3q27.3	Start	187,668,912 bp
Band	3q27.3	End	187,670,394 bp

Gene location (Mouse)
Chr.	Chromosome 16 (mouse)
Band	16 B1|16 15.0 cM	Start	23,708,323 bp
Band	16 B1|16 15.0 cM	End	23,709,708 bp
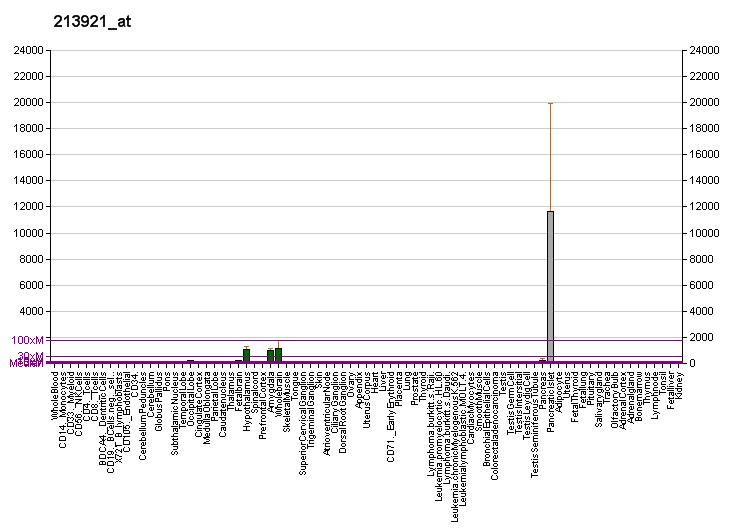
RNA expression pattern
Bgee	Human / Mouse (ortholog); Top expressed in: beta cell; body of pancreas; duodenum; cardia; jejunal mucosa; pylorus; orbitofrontal cortex; prefrontal cortex; nucleus accumbens; putamen / Top expressed in: islet of Langerhans; entorhinal cortex; perirhinal cortex; superior frontal gyrus; anterior amygdaloid area; arcuate nucleus; primary visual cortex; dentate gyrus of hippocampal formation granule cell; subiculum; CA3 field; More reference expression data
BioGPS	More reference expression data
Gene ontology
Molecular function	hormone activity
Cellular component	extracellular region; soma; extracellular space
Biological process	negative regulation of cell population proliferation; hormone-mediated apoptotic signaling pathway; hyperosmotic response; chemical synaptic transmission; regulation of cell migration; response to heat; response to nutrient; response to acidic pH; response to steroid hormone; G protein-coupled receptor signaling pathway; response to amino acid; cell-cell signaling; response to organonitrogen compound; digestion; cell surface receptor signaling pathway; regulation of signaling receptor activity
Sources:Amigo / QuickGO
Orthologs
Species	Human	Mouse
Entrez	6750	20604
Ensembl	ENSG00000157005	ENSMUSG00000004366
UniProt	P61278	P60041
RefSeq (mRNA)	NM_001048	NM_009215
RefSeq (protein)	NP_001039	NP_033241
Location (UCSC)	Chr 3: 187.67 – 187.67 Mb	Chr 16: 23.71 – 23.71 Mb
PubMed search
- Wikidata
View/Edit Human	View/Edit Mouse

Somatostatin, also known as growth hormone-inhibiting hormone (GHIH) or by several other names, is a peptide hormone that regulates the endocrine system and affects neurotransmission and cell proliferation via interaction with G protein-coupled somatostatin receptors and inhibition of the release of numerous secondary hormones. Somatostatin inhibits insulin and glucagon secretion.

Somatostatin has two active forms produced by the alternative cleavage of a single preproprotein: one consisting of 14 amino acids (shown in infobox to right), the other consisting of 28 amino acids. Alternate cleavage sites of the SST preproprotein results in the production of the hormone Neuronostatin, which has two active forms as Neuronostatin-13 and Neuronostatin-19. Neuronostatin is distinct from Somatostatin in its amino acid sequence, post-translation modifications and receptor binding.

Among the vertebrates, there exist six different somatostatin genes that have been named: SS1, SS2, SS3, SS4, SS5 and SS6. Zebrafish have all six. The six different genes, along with the five different somatostatin receptors, allow somatostatin to possess a large range of functions. Humans have only one somatostatin gene, SST.

== Nomenclature ==
Synonyms of "somatostatin" include:

- growth hormone–inhibiting hormone (GHIH)
- growth hormone release–inhibiting hormone (GHRIH)
- somatotropin release–inhibiting factor (SRIF)
- somatotropin release–inhibiting hormone (SRIH)

== Production ==
=== Digestive system ===
Somatostatin is secreted by delta cells at several locations in the digestive system, namely the pyloric antrum, the duodenum and the pancreatic islets.

Somatostatin released in the pyloric antrum travels via the portal venous system to the heart, then enters the systemic circulation to reach the locations where it will exert its inhibitory effects. In addition, somatostatin release from delta cells can act in a paracrine manner.

In the stomach, somatostatin acts directly on the acid-producing parietal cells via a G-protein coupled receptor (which inhibits adenylate cyclase, thus effectively antagonising the stimulatory effect of histamine) to reduce acid secretion. Somatostatin can also indirectly decrease stomach acid production by preventing the release of other hormones, including gastrin and histamine which effectively slows down the digestive process.

=== Brain ===
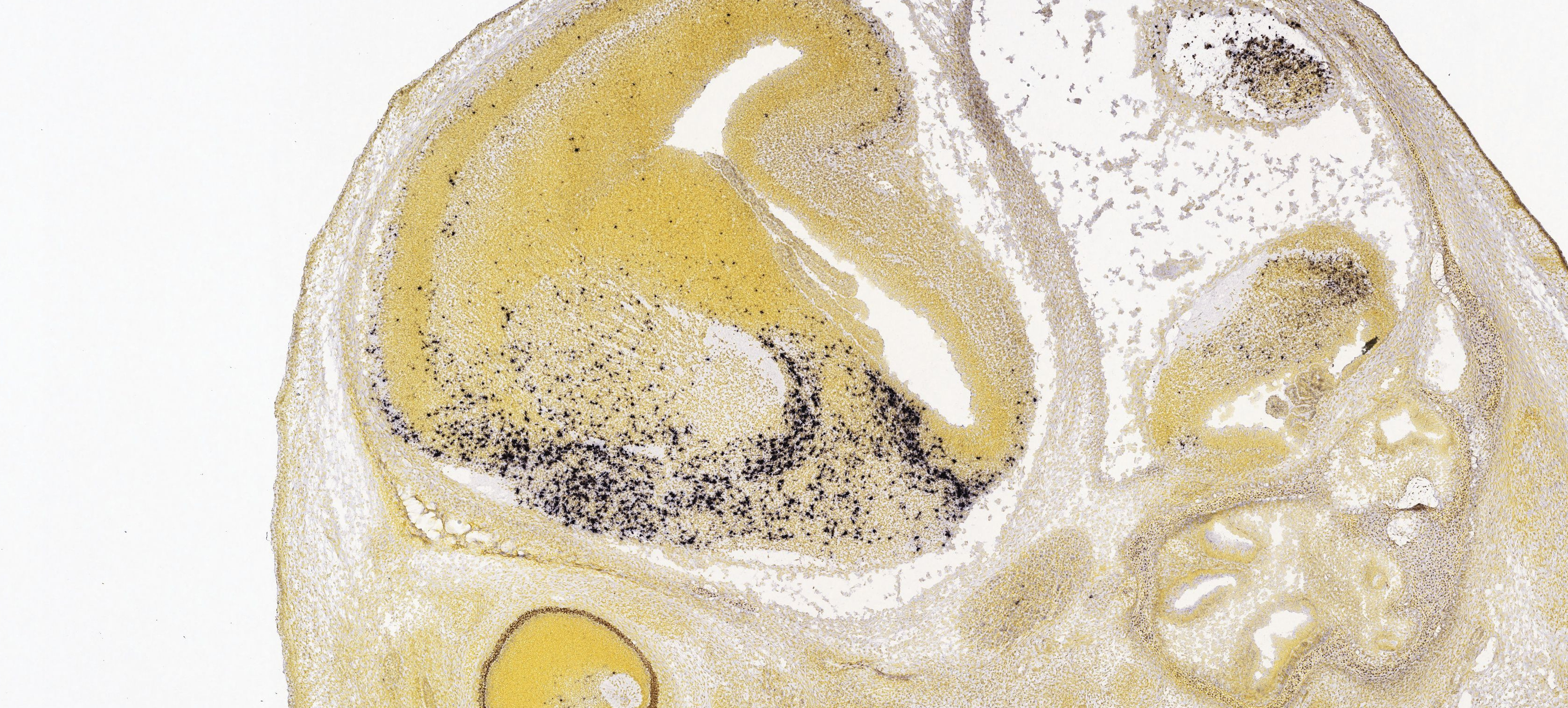
Sst is expressed in interneurons in the telencephalon of the embryonic day 15.5 mouse. Allen Brain Atlases

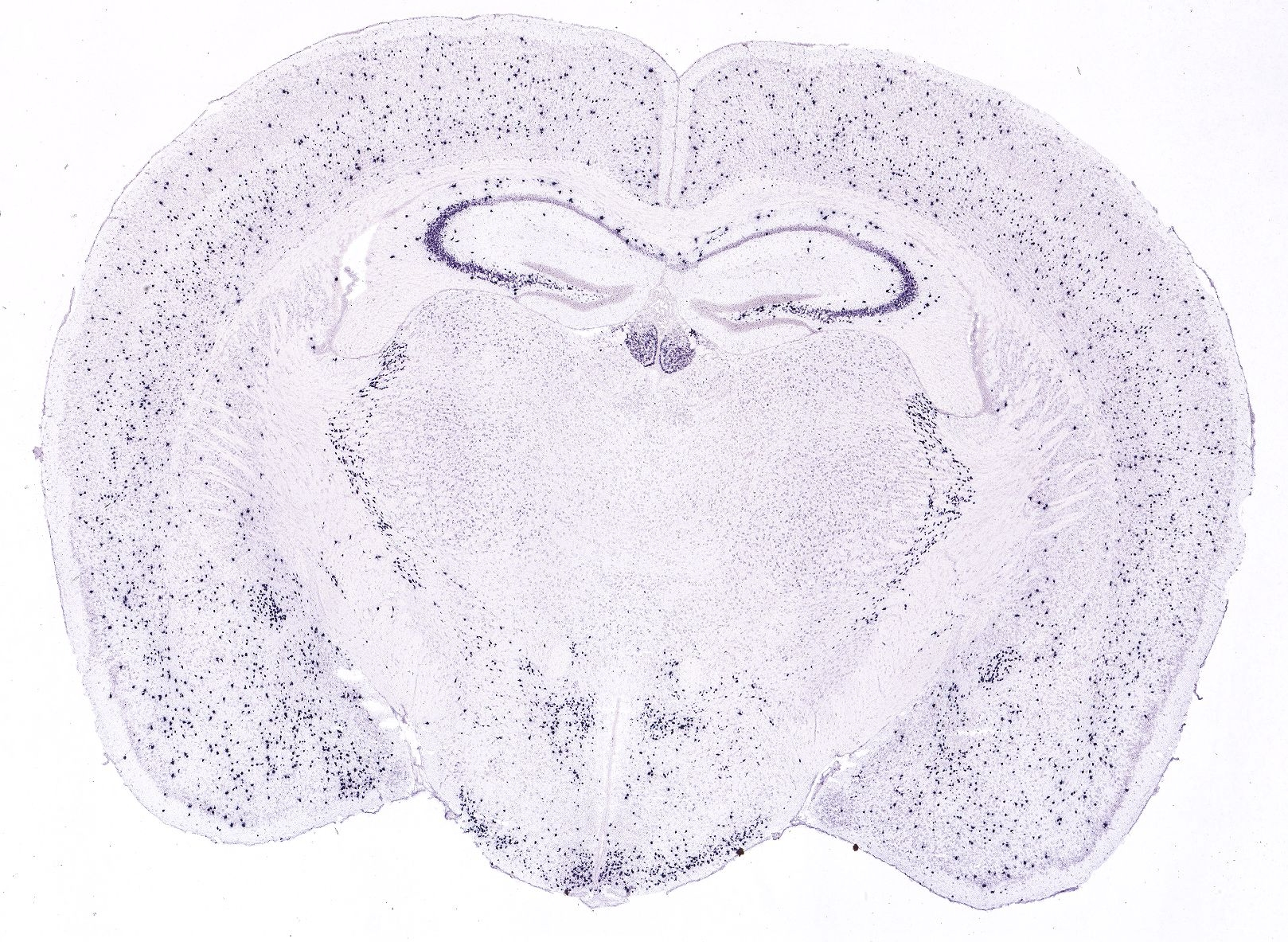
Sst expression in the adult mouse. Allen Brain Atlases

Somatostatin is produced by neuroendocrine neurons of the ventromedial nucleus of the hypothalamus. These neurons project to the median eminence, where somatostatin is released from neurosecretory nerve endings into the hypothalamohypophysial system through neuron axons. Somatostatin is then carried to the anterior pituitary gland, where it inhibits the secretion of growth hormone from somatotrope cells. The somatostatin neurons in the periventricular nucleus mediate negative feedback effects of growth hormone on its own release; the somatostatin neurons respond to high circulating concentrations of growth hormone and somatomedins by increasing the release of somatostatin, so reducing the rate of secretion of growth hormone.

Somatostatin is also produced by several other populations that project centrally, i.e., to other areas of the brain, and somatostatin receptors are expressed at many different sites in the brain. In particular, populations of somatostatin neurons occur in the arcuate nucleus, the hippocampus, and the brainstem nucleus of the solitary tract.

== Functions ==
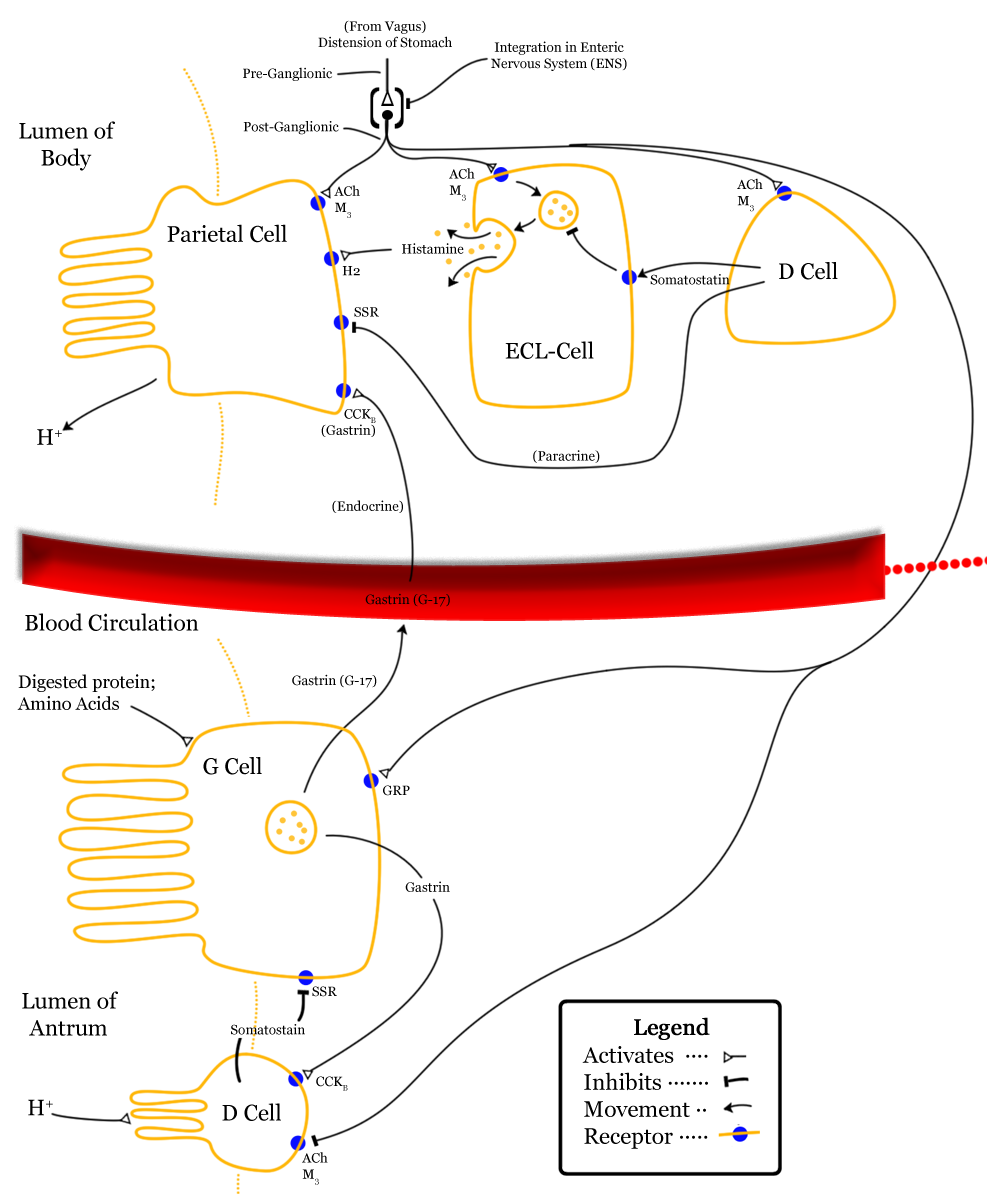
D cell is visible at upper right, and somatostatin is represented by middle arrow pointing left

Somatostatin is classified as an inhibitory hormone, and is induced by low pH. Its actions are spread to different parts of the body. Somatostatin release is inhibited by the vagus nerve.

=== Anterior pituitary ===
In the anterior pituitary gland, the effects of somatostatin are:

- Inhibiting the release of growth hormone (GH) (thus opposing the effects of growth hormone–releasing hormone (GHRH))
- Inhibiting the release of thyroid-stimulating hormone (TSH)
- Inhibiting the release of prolactin (PRL)

=== Gastrointestinal system ===
- Somatostatin is homologous with cortistatin (see somatostatin family) and suppresses the release of gastrointestinal hormones
- Decreases the rate of gastric emptying, and reduces smooth muscle contractions and blood flow within the intestine
- Inhibits adenylyl cyclase in parietal cells, thereby suppressing gastric acid secretion
- Suppresses the release of pancreatic hormones
  - Somatostatin release is triggered by the beta cell peptide urocortin3 (Ucn3) to inhibit insulin release.
  - Inhibits the release of glucagon
- Suppresses the exocrine secretory action of the pancreas

== Synthetic substitutes ==
Octreotide (brand name Sandostatin, Novartis Pharmaceuticals) is an octapeptide that mimics natural somatostatin pharmacologically, though is a more potent inhibitor of growth hormone, glucagon, and insulin than the natural hormone, and has a much longer half-life (about 90 minutes, compared to 2–3 minutes for somatostatin). Since it is absorbed poorly from the gut, it is administered parenterally (subcutaneously, intramuscularly, or intravenously). It is indicated for symptomatic treatment of carcinoid syndrome and acromegaly. It is also finding increased use in polycystic diseases of the liver and kidney.

Lanreotide (Somatuline, Ipsen Pharmaceuticals) is a medication used in the management of acromegaly and symptoms caused by neuroendocrine tumors, most notably carcinoid syndrome. It is a long-acting analog of somatostatin, like octreotide. It is available in several countries, including the United Kingdom, Australia, and Canada, and was approved for sale in the United States by the Food and Drug Administration on August 30, 2007.

Pasireotide, sold under the brand name Signifor, is an orphan drug approved in the United States and the European Union for the treatment of Cushing's disease in patients who fail or are ineligible for surgical therapy. It was developed by Novartis. Pasireotide is somatostatin analog with a 40-fold increased affinity to somatostatin receptor 5 compared to other somatostatin analogs.

== Evolutionary history ==
Six somatostatin genes have been discovered in vertebrates. The current proposed history as to how these six genes arose is based on the three whole-genome duplication events that took place in vertebrate evolution along with local duplications in teleost fish. An ancestral somatostatin gene was duplicated during the first whole-genome duplication event (1R) to create SS1 and SS2. These two genes were duplicated during the second whole-genome duplication event (2R) to create four new somatostatin genes:SS1, SS2, SS3, and one gene that was lost during the evolution of vertebrates. Tetrapods retained SS1 (also known as SS-14 and SS-28) and SS2 (also known as cortistatin) after the split in the Sarcopterygii and Actinopterygii lineage split. In teleost fish, SS1, SS2, and SS3 were duplicated during the third whole-genome duplication event (3R) to create SS1, SS2, SS4, SS5, and two genes that were lost during the evolution of teleost fish. SS1 and SS2 went through local duplications to give rise to SS6 and SS3.

== See also ==
- FK962
- Hypothalamic–pituitary–somatic axis
- Octreotide
