= Cortistatin (neuropeptide) =

Mammalian protein found in humans

CORT

Identifiers
- Aliases: CORT, CST-14, CST-17, CST-29, cortistatin, SST2
- External IDs: OMIM: 602784; MGI: 109538; GeneCards: CORT

Gene location (Human)
Chr.	Chromosome 1 (human)
Band	1p36.22	Start	10,450,031 bp
Band	1p36.22	End	10,451,998 bp

Gene location (Mouse)
Chr.	Chromosome 4 (mouse)
Band	4 E2|4 78.89 cM	Start	149,209,491 bp
Band	4 E2|4 78.89 cM	End	149,211,220 bp
RNA expression pattern
Bgee	Human / Mouse (ortholog); Top expressed in: putamen; caudate nucleus; prefrontal cortex; nucleus accumbens; superior frontal gyrus; anterior cingulate cortex; gonad; temporal lobe; amygdala; Brodmann area 9 / Top expressed in: embryo; primary visual cortex; embryo; dentate gyrus of hippocampal formation granule cell; superior frontal gyrus; hippocampus proper; fetal liver hematopoietic progenitor cell; perirhinal cortex; tail of embryo; olfactory bulb; More reference expression data
BioGPS	n/a
Gene ontology
Molecular function	neuropeptide hormone activity; G protein-coupled receptor binding; hormone activity; chromatin binding; double-stranded DNA binding
Cellular component	extracellular region; Fanconi anaemia nuclear complex; FANCM-MHF complex; extracellular space
Biological process	adenylate cyclase-inhibiting G protein-coupled receptor signaling pathway; chemical synaptic transmission; mitotic recombination; resolution of meiotic recombination intermediates; interstrand cross-link repair; replication fork processing; regulation of signaling receptor activity; G protein-coupled receptor signaling pathway
Sources:Amigo / QuickGO
Orthologs
Databases	NCBI: entry; OMA: entry
Species	Human	Mouse
Entrez	1325	12854
Ensembl	ENSG00000241563	ENSMUSG00000028971
UniProt	O00230	P56469
RefSeq (mRNA)	NM_001302	NM_007745
RefSeq (protein)	NP_001293	NP_031771
Location (UCSC)	Chr 1: 10.45 – 10.45 Mb	Chr 4: 149.21 – 149.21 Mb
PubMed search
- Wikidata
View/Edit Human	View/Edit Mouse

Precortistatin is a protein that in humans is encoded by the CORT gene. The 105 amino acid residue human precortistatin in turn is cleaved into cortistatin-17 and cortistatin-29. Cortistatin-17 is the only active peptide derived from the precursor. Cortistatin (or more specifically cortistatin-17) is a neuropeptide that is expressed in inhibitory neurons of the cerebral cortex, and which has a strong structural similarity to somatostatin. Unlike somatostatin, when infused into the brain, it enhances slow-wave sleep. It binds to sites in the cortex, hippocampus and the amygdala.

== Structure, sequence conservation, and chemical synthesis ==
Peptide rCST14 shares 11 of its 14 amino acids with SST14, including the two cysteine residues that form the cyclic structure. Circular dichroism and nuclear magnetic resonance spectroscopy indicate that cyclic rCST14 does not adopt a single defined conformation in solution. The principal processing products of the preprocortistatin and preprosomatostatin genes are the 29/28-mer and 14-mer peptides. Within the N-terminal 15/14 residues of the 29/28-mer peptides, cortistatin and somatostatin show notable sequence similarity. However, only one residue is conserved between rCST14 and rCST29 in this region in rat and human peptides, with no clearly identifiable structurally or functionally homologous regions; two residues are conserved in mouse peptides. By contrast, the N-terminal sequence of somatostatin is highly conserved across species, differing by only one amino acid between human and chicken and by two between human and frog. The functional significance of this region in cortistatin signaling remains unclear, although these structural differences may contribute to physiologically relevant distinctions between CST29 and SST28 activity.

Separately, the cortistatins (cortistatins A–L) constitute a class of marine natural products characterized by an unusual steroidal skeleton and distinct from the endogenous neuropeptide cortistatin. Synthetic studies have proposed that cortistatins A and J may arise from cortistatin L, or from a precursor of equivalent oxidation state, with cortistatin L itself potentially generated by C2 oxidation of cortistatin K. Cortistatins A, J, K, and L have been synthesized through parallel routes from closely related intermediates derived from a common precursor. These compounds have been reported to inhibit proliferation of various mammalian cell types in culture through mechanisms that remain unclear.

== Biosynthesis and processing ==
Cortistatin is a 112-amino-acid protein encoded by the preprocortistatin gene, which contains multiple potential endoproteolytic cleavage sites. Preprocortistatin is cleaved at two C-terminal dibasic sites (KK and KR) to generate rCST14 and rCST29, analogous to SST14 and SST28 derived from preprosomatostatin. In tissue culture cells, the ratio of rCST14:rCST29:preprocortistatin was reported as 41:55:4.5, whereas secreted peptides showed an approximate rCST14:rCST29 ratio of 2:1, indicating preferential release of rCST14 despite near-equal production. The enzymes responsible for cortistatin processing remain unknown; however, mouse AtT-20 cells express the proprotein convertases PC1 and PC2, both of which are highly expressed in the cerebral cortex, a major site of cortistatin expression. Because PC1 and PC2 also participate in preprosomatostatin processing, they are considered plausible candidates for in vivo preprocortistatin processing.

== Comparison with somatostatin ==
The 14-mer cortistatin and somatostatin peptides are structurally similar, with rat CST14 and SST14 sharing 11 of 14 residues. Most differences occur outside the cyclic region. In the N-terminal extracyclic region, CST14 contains either a single Pro residue in rat and mouse or an Asp–Arg–Met–Pro sequence in humans, whereas SST14 contains an Ala–Gly sequence. At the C-terminus, SST14 ends with the cysteine residue that participates in the Cys–Cys loop, whereas all known CST14 peptides are predicted to contain an additional lysine residue beyond this cysteine. It remains uncertain whether this C-terminal lysine is retained in the mature peptide, as it represents a likely site for carboxypeptidase-mediated cleavage, although radioimmunoassay and HPLC analysis of brain extracts identified a peptide with an elution profile consistent with CST14.

Within the Cys–Cys loop, rat and mouse CST14 peptides are identical, whereas the human peptide differs by a single substitution in which arginine replaces lysine immediately following the N-terminal cysteine. CST14 also differs from SST14 within the loop by containing a serine residue two positions upstream of the C-terminal cysteine, where SST14 contains threonine. Several of these structural differences have been shown to have physiological and pharmacological significance for cortistatin function.

== Function ==
Cortistatin is a neuropeptide with strong structural similarity to somatostatin (both peptides belong to the same family). It binds to all known somatostatin receptors, and shares many pharmacological and functional properties with somatostatin, including the depression of neuronal activity. However, it also has many properties distinct from somatostatin, such as induction of slow-wave sleep, apparently by antagonism of the excitatory effects of acetylcholine on the cortex, reduction of locomotor activity, and activation of cation selective currents not responsive to somatostatin.

== Clinical significance ==
=== Diagnostic ===
Cortistatin is a cyclic neuropeptide related tosomatostatin that has emerged as a potential endogenous antiin-flammatory factor based on its production by, and binding to, immune cell. Studies from say the use of Cortistatin treatment significantly help the clinical and histopathologic severity of the inflammatory colitis, stopping body weight loss, diarrhea, and inflammation. There was also a notable increase in the survival rate of the colitic mice. The use of Cortistatin treatment's therapeutic effect was associated with notable down-regulation of inflammatory and the down-regulation of the Th1-driven autoimmune response. This includes the regulation of a wide spectrum of inflammatory mediators. Also, there was partial involvement of regulatory IL-10-secreting T cells in this therapeutic effect. The most important factor for this Cortistatin Treatment was that it was therapeutically effective in colitis and it avoided the recurrence of the disease. This work in Cortistatin Treatment identifies cortistatin as a potential antiinflammatory factor with the capacity to deactivate the intestinal inflammatory response and restore mucosal immune tolerance at multiple levels.

Another study tested Cortistatin to treat Osteoarthritis on mice. Osteoarthritis is a degenerative joint disease caused by the breakdown of cartilage. The tumor necrosis factor (TNF-α) is known to play a critical role in Osteoarthritis. The results showed that Cortistatin competitively bounded to TNFR1 as well as TNFR2. Cortistatin suppressed the proinflammatory function of TNF-α. Notably, both the spontaneous and surgically induced Osteoarthritis models indicated that deficiency of Cortistatin led to an accelerated Osteoarthritis-like phenotype. Analysis of TNFR1- and TNFR2-knockout mice found that TNFRs might be involved in the protective role of Cortistatin in Osteoarthritis. Mice treated with cortistatin for 3 consecutive days starting 6 days after TNBS administration and the onset of disease quickly reversed the lost body weight. Cortistatin treatment completely removed established colitis and reduced the disease recurrence. Mice treated with cortistatin 12 h after TNBS injection survived and did not suffer disease recurrence after a second administration of TNBS.

Another study tested Cortistatin treatments on a preclinical mouse model of Parkinson's disease induced by acute exposure to the neurotoxin 1-methil-4-phenyl1-1,2,3,6-tetrahydropyridine (MPTP). Researchers observed that treatment with cortistatin mitigated the MPTP-induced loss of dopaminergic neurons, which are in the substantia nigra and their connections to the striatum. The study found that cortistatin administration improved the locomotor activity of mice intoxicated with 1-methil-4-phenyl1-1,2,3,6-tetrahydropyridine. The study also found that cortistatin diminished the presence and activation of glial cells in the affected brain regions of 1-methil-4-phenyl1-1,2,3,6-tetrahydropyridine-treated mice. Cortistatin also reduced the production of immune mediators and also promoted the expression of neurotrophic factors in the striatum of mice. In conclusion, these findings again suggest that cortistatin could emerge as a potential antiinflammatory factor and that cortistatin has neuroprotective properties to regulate the progression of Parkinson's disease.
