= Mozenavir =

Chemical compound

Clinical data
- Trade names: Mozenavir

Legal status
- Legal status: US: Investigational New Drug

Identifiers
- IUPAC name: (4R,5S,6S,7R)-1,3-bis[(3-aminophenyl)methyl]-4,7-dibenzyl-5,6-dihydroxy-1,3-diazepan-2-one
- CAS Number: 174391-92-5
- PubChem CID: 154044
- ChemSpider: 135759
- UNII: 64OO8946ER
- CompTox Dashboard (EPA): DTXSID40169822

Chemical and physical data
- Formula: C_{33}H_{36}N_{4}O_{3}
- Molar mass: 536.676 g·mol^{−1}
- 3D model (JSmol): Interactive image
- SMILES: C1=CC=C(C=C1)C[C@@H]2[C@@H]([C@H]([C@H](N(C(=O)N2CC3=CC(=CC=C3)N)CC4=CC(=CC=C4)N)CC5=CC=CC=C5)O)O
- InChI: InChI=1S/C33H36N4O3/c34-27-15-7-13-25(17-27)21-36-29(19-23-9-3-1-4-10-23)31(38)32(39)30(20-24-11-5-2-6-12-24)37(33(36)40)22-26-14-8-16-28(35)18-26/h1-18,29-32,38-39H,19-22,34-35H2/t29-,30-,31+,32+/m1/s1; Key:KYRSNWPSSXSNEP-ZRTHHSRSSA-N

Mozenavir (DMP-450) is an antiviral drug which was developed as a treatment for HIV/AIDS. It acts as an HIV protease inhibitor and binds to this target with high affinity, however despite promising results in early testing, mozenavir was unsuccessful in human clinical trials. Studies continue into related derivatives.
