= Pasireotide =

Pharmaceutical drug

Clinical data
- Trade names: Signifor, Signifor LAR
- Other names: SOM230
- AHFS/Drugs.com: Monograph
- License data: US DailyMed: Pasireotide
- Pregnancy category: AU: B3
- Routes of administration: Subcutaneous injection, intramuscular injection
- ATC code: H01CB05 (WHO)

Legal status
- Legal status: UK: POM (Prescription only); US: ℞-only; EU: Rx-only; In general: ℞ (Prescription only)

Identifiers
- IUPAC name: [(3S,6S,9S,12R,15S,18S,20R)-9-(4-aminobutyl)-3-benzyl-12-(1H-indol-3-ylmethyl)-2,5,8,11,14,17-hexaoxo-15-phenyl-6-[(4-phenylmethoxyphenyl)methyl]-1,4,7,10,13,16-hexazabicyclo[16.3.0]henicosan-20-yl] N-(2-aminoethyl)carbamate
- CAS Number: 396091-73-9
- PubChem CID: 9941444
- IUPHAR/BPS: 2018
- DrugBank: DB06663
- ChemSpider: 8117062
- UNII: 98H1T17066
- KEGG: D10147
- ChEBI: CHEBI:72312
- ECHA InfoCard: 100.211.883

Chemical and physical data
- Formula: C_{58}H_{66}N_{10}O_{9}
- Molar mass: 1047.227 g·mol^{−1}
- 3D model (JSmol): Interactive image
- SMILES: C1[C@H](CN2[C@@H]1C(=O)N[C@H](C(=O)N[C@@H](C(=O)N[C@H](C(=O)N[C@H](C(=O)N[C@H](C2=O)CC3=CC=CC=C3)CC4=CC=C(C=C4)OCC5=CC=CC=C5)CCCCN)CC6=CNC7=CC=CC=C76)C8=CC=CC=C8)OC(=O)NCCN
- InChI: InChI=1S/C58H66N10O9/c59-27-13-12-22-46-52(69)64-47(30-38-23-25-42(26-24-38)76-36-39-16-6-2-7-17-39)53(70)66-49(31-37-14-4-1-5-15-37)57(74)68-35-43(77-58(75)61-29-28-60)33-50(68)55(72)67-51(40-18-8-3-9-19-40)56(73)65-48(54(71)63-46)32-41-34-62-45-21-11-10-20-44(41)45/h1-11,14-21,23-26,34,43,46-51,62H,12-13,22,27-33,35-36,59-60H2,(H,61,75)(H,63,71)(H,64,69)(H,65,73)(H,66,70)(H,67,72)/t43-,46+,47+,48-,49+,50+,51+/m1/s1; Key:VMZMNAABQBOLAK-DBILLSOUSA-N

Pasireotide, sold under the brand name Signifor, is an orphan drug approved in the United States and the European Union for the treatment of Cushing's disease in patients who fail or are ineligible for surgical therapy. It was developed by Novartis. Pasireotide is a somatostatin analog with a 40-fold increased affinity to somatostatin receptor 5 compared to other somatostatin analogs.

The most common side effects include hyperglycaemia (high blood sugar levels), diabetes, diarrhoea, abdominal pain (stomach ache), nausea (feeling sick), cholelithiasis (gallstones), injection site reactions, and tiredness.

Pasireotide was approved for Cushing's disease by the European Medicines Agency (EMA) in April 2012 and by the U.S. Food and Drug Administration (FDA) in December 2012.

Pasireotide LAR (the long-acting-release formulation) was approved by the FDA for treatment of acromegaly in December 2014, and had been approved for this indication by the EMA in September 2014.
