= Somatostatin receptor 5 =

Protein-coding gene in the species Homo sapiens

SSTR5

Identifiers
- Aliases: SSTR5, SS-5-R, Somatostatin receptor 5
- External IDs: MGI: 894282; GeneCards: SSTR5

Gene location (Human)
Chr.	Chromosome 16 (human)
Band	16p13.3	Start	1,072,747 bp
Band	16p13.3	End	1,081,454 bp

Gene location (Mouse)
Chr.	Chromosome 17 (mouse)
Band	17 A3.3|17 12.62 cM	Start	25,708,849 bp
Band	17 A3.3|17 12.62 cM	End	25,716,262 bp
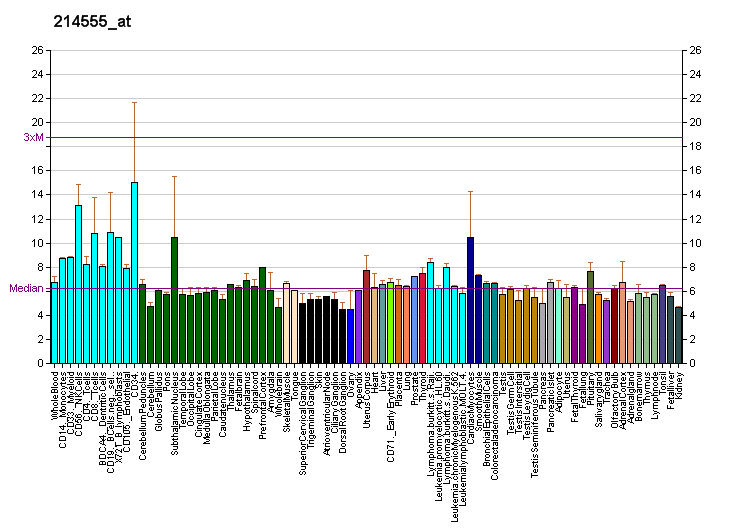
RNA expression pattern
Bgee	Human / Mouse (ortholog); Top expressed in: right auricle of heart; apex of heart; anterior pituitary; right adrenal cortex; left ventricle; Descending thoracic aorta; left adrenal cortex; ascending aorta; right coronary artery; metanephros / Top expressed in: embryo; embryo; choroid plexus of fourth ventricle; soleus muscle; entorhinal cortex; superior frontal gyrus; primary motor cortex; superior colliculus; basal forebrain; striatum of neuraxis; More reference expression data
BioGPS	More reference expression data
Gene ontology
Molecular function	neuropeptide binding; G protein-coupled receptor activity; signal transducer activity; somatostatin receptor activity; peptide binding
Cellular component	integral component of membrane; neuron projection; plasma membrane; integral component of plasma membrane; membrane
Biological process	positive regulation of cytokinesis; G protein-coupled receptor signaling pathway; G protein-coupled receptor signaling pathway, coupled to cyclic nucleotide second messenger; glucose homeostasis; signal transduction; negative regulation of cell population proliferation; regulation of insulin secretion; somatostatin signaling pathway; chemical synaptic transmission; cellular response to glucocorticoid stimulus; neuropeptide signaling pathway
Sources:Amigo / QuickGO
Orthologs
Databases	NCBI: entry; OMA: entry
Species	Human	Mouse
Entrez	6755	20609
Ensembl	ENSG00000162009	ENSMUSG00000050824
UniProt	P35346	O08858
RefSeq (mRNA)	NM_001053; NM_001172560; NM_001172572; NM_001172573	NM_001191008; NM_011425
RefSeq (protein)	NP_001044; NP_001166031	NP_001177937; NP_035555
Location (UCSC)	Chr 16: 1.07 – 1.08 Mb	Chr 17: 25.71 – 25.72 Mb
PubMed search
- Wikidata
View/Edit Human	View/Edit Mouse

Somatostatin receptor type 5 is a protein that in humans is encoded by the SSTR5 gene.

Somatostatin acts at many sites to inhibit the release of many hormones and other secretory proteins. The biological effects of somatostatin are probably mediated by a family of G protein-coupled receptors that are expressed in a tissue-specific manner. SSTR5 is a member of the superfamily of receptors having seven transmembrane segments.

== Ligands ==
Agonists

- L-817818
- Zavolosotine

== See also ==
- Somatostatin receptor
