= Siegfried Oberndorfer =

German physician and pathologist

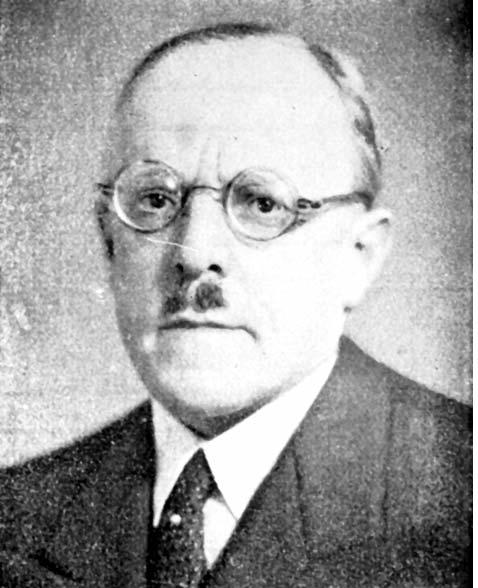
- Siegfried Oberndorfer
- Born: 24 June 1876; Munich
- Died: 1944 (aged 67–68); Istanbul
- Known for: carcinoid
- Scientific career
- Fields: physician pathologist

Siegfried Oberndorfer (24 June 1876 in Munich – 1944 in Istanbul) was a Jewish-German physician, pathologist, and cancer researcher.

== Medical studies ==
Oberndorfer studied medicine in Munich and Kiel, earning the title of doctor in 1900. From October 1900 to September 1901, he assisted Friedrich Wilhelm Zahn in Geneva. Working as a ship's doctor, he ended an outbreak of plague on the Hamburg-to-Brazil route in 1901. In 1902, he returned to Germany as assistant to the pathological institute of the Ludwig-Maximilians-Universität München, headed by Otto Bollinger.

== Early medical career ==
In 1906, Oberndorfer was promoted to lead the pathological institute of the Rechts der Isar Hospital. In 1906, he qualified as a professor in pathological anatomy, presenting a thesis on chronic appendicitis. In 1907, he introduced the medical term carcinoid (German: Karzinoide) that is still in use today. From 1910, he headed the pathology department of the Schwabing Clinic in Munich.

== World War I service ==
With the outbreak of World War I in August 1914, Oberndorfer volunteered as a doctor for the military. He worked in a field hospital on the western front until 1916, then served as an army pathologist until the war ended in 1918.

By detailed autopsies of soldiers killed in combat, Oberndorfer investigated possible therapies to heal serious war injuries. His examining instruments are lodged in a display case in the foyer of the Schwabing Clinic — along with scientific notes about his experiences as a field doctor and handwritten letters from the front to his family in Munich. His professional certificates, military honors and medals are also on display.

== Sacked by Nazis, takes exile in Turkey ==
On April 1, 1933, the newly installed Nazi regime dismissed Oberndorfer from the Schwabing Clinic — along with chief physicians Otto Neubauer and David Mandelbaum — due to his Jewish ancestry.

In autumn 1933, following an invitation from Istanbul University, Oberndorfer left Germany for Turkey. He continued living and publishing in Turkey for the rest of his life, working as a full professor at the medical school and director of the Institute for General and Experimental Pathology in Istanbul. In 1937, he was transferred to the Institute for Cancer Research.

Oberndorfer died in 1944 from a mediastinal tumor.

== Publications ==
- Karzinoide Tumoren des Dünndarmes. Frankfurter Zeitschrift für Pathologie, 1907, 1: 426-429.
- Pathologisch-anatomische Situsbilder der Bauchhöhle. In: Lehman’s Medizinische Atlanten, Munich, 1922.
- Die Geschwülste des Darmes. In: Handbuch der pathologischen Anatomie, Band 4,3, Berlin, 1929.
- Prostata, Hoden, Geschwülste. In: Handbuch der pathologischen Anatomie, Band 6, Berlin, 1931.
