= Neurohormone =

Hormone released by neuroendocrine cells

Endocrine hormones in the central nervous system

A neurohormone is any hormone produced and released by neuroendocrine cells (also called neurosecretory cells) into the blood. By definition of being hormones, they are secreted into the circulation for systemic effect, but they can also have a role of neurotransmitter or other roles such as autocrine (self) or paracrine (local) messenger.

The hypothalamus releasing hormones are neurohypophysial hormones in specialized hypothalamic neurons which extend to the median eminence and posterior pituitary. The adrenal medulla produces adrenomedullary hormones in chromaffin cells, cells which are very similar in structure to post-synaptic sympathetic neurons, even though they are not neurons they are derivatives of the neural crest.

Enterochromaffin and enterochromaffin-like cells, both being enteroendocrine cells, are also considered neuroendocrine cells due to their structural and functional similarity to chromaffin cells, although they are not derivatives of the neural crest. Other neuroendocrine cells are scattered throughout the body. Neurohormone are released by neurosecretory cells

== Releasing hormones ==
Releasing hormones also known as hypophysiotropic or hypothalamic hormones are synthesized by different kinds of specialized neurons in the hypothalamus. They are then transported along neuronal axons to their axon terminals forming the bulk of the median eminence, where they are stored and released into the hypophyseal portal system. They then rapidly reach the anterior pituitary where they exert their hormonal action. The residual hormones pass into the systemic circulation where they are diluted, degraded and have comparatively little effects. The synthesis, control, and release of those hormones is co-regulated by hormonal, local and synaptic signals (neurotransmitters). The neurons secreting various hormones have been found to discharge impulses in burst, causing a pulsatile release which is more efficient than a continuous release. Hypophysiotropic hormones include:

- Thyrotropin-releasing hormone
- Corticotropin-releasing hormone
- Growth hormone-releasing hormone
- Somatostatin
- Gonadotropin-releasing hormone
- Dopamine
- Neurotensin

== Neurohypophysial hormones ==
Neurohypophysial hormones are synthesized in the magnocellular secretory neurons of the hypothalamus. They are then transported along neuronal axons within the infundibular stalk to their axon terminals forming the pars nervosa of the posterior pituitary, where they are stored and released into the systemic circulation. The synthesis, control, and release of those hormones is co-regulated by hormonal, local and synaptic signals. Neurohypophysial hormones include:

- Oxytocin
- Vasopressin

This is through this pathway that the vast majority of oxytocin and vasopressin hormones reach the systemic circulation.

== Adrenomedullary hormones ==
Adrenomedullary hormones are catecholamines secreted from the adrenal medulla by chromaffin cells, neurosecretory cells connected to the central nervous system. The synthesis, storage (in chromaffin cells) and release of catecholamines is co-regulated by synaptic input from their respective pre-synaptic sympathetic neurons, as well as hormonal and local inputs. The adrenomedullary hormones are:

- Adrenaline
- Noradrenaline
- Dopamine

== Enteric neurohormones ==
Enterochromaffin cells in the epithelia lining the lumen of the digestive tract secrete serotonin, while enterochromaffin-like cells at the stomach glands secrete histamine. Their synthesis, storage, and release of hormones is co-regulated by hormonal, local and nervous inputs.

== See also ==
- Natural neuroactive substance
