= Tanycyte =

Specialized ependymal cell in the brain

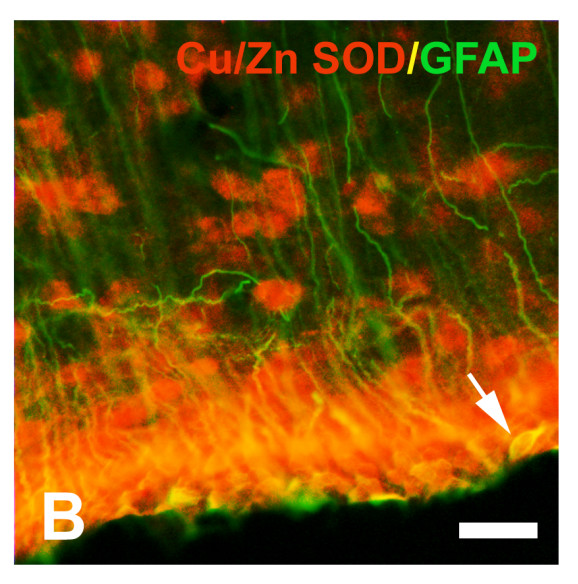
- Third ventricle wall in the brain of an immature rat. A tanycyte coexpressing CuZn SOD and GFAP is marked by the arrow.

Details
- Location: Ependyma of third ventricle of the brain

Identifiers
- Latin: tanycytus
- NeuroLex ID: sao1149261773
- TH: H2.00.06.2.01007
- FMA: 54560

Tanycytes are highly specialized ependymal cells found in the third ventricle of the brain, and on the floor of the fourth ventricle. Each tanycyte has a long basal process that extends deep into the hypothalamus. It is possible that their function is to transfer chemical signals from the cerebrospinal fluid to the central nervous system.

The term tanycyte comes from the Greek word tanus which means elongated.

== Structure ==
Tanycytes are highly specialized ependymal cells (also called ependymoglial cells) with long basal processes. Tanycytes in adult mammals are found in the ventricular system, and the median eminence, a circumventricular organ. They are most numerous in the third ventricle of the brain, are also found in the fourth ventricle, and can also be seen in the spinal cord radiating from the central canal (also known as the ependymal canal), to the spinal cord surface. The long processes extend through the layer of astrocytes to cross the median eminence and form end-feet on neuropil, and blood vessels near the portal perivascular space.

=== Processes ===
Along the process from each tanycyte are some unusual protrusions as spikes, and swellings, and at their end feet are boutons or claws. The different protrusions contain blood vessels, and contact different neurons, and cells. The protrusions contain ribosomes, mitochondria, varied vesicles, and transporters.

=== Subtypes ===
In the third ventricle four different subtypes of tanycte populations with differing structure, morphology, genetics, and function have been defined. These are named beta 2 (β2) and beta 1 (β1), and alpha 2 (α2) and alpha 1 (α1).

β2 tanycytes line the median eminence; β1 tanycytes line part of the infundibular recess.

α2 tanycytes line the dorsomedial arcuate nucleus; α1 tanycytes line the ventromedial nucleus and the dorsomedial nucleus.

== Function ==
A tanycyte has a single long basal process that crosses into the hypothalamic parenchyma to make contact with blood vessels and an array of neurons. The different components of the tanycyte process protrusions that include ribosomes, mitochondria, and transporters, indicate communication between the tanycytes and blood vessels, and between the tanycytes and neurons. These interactions are associated with the regulation of different neuroendocrine functions.

Tanycytes have been shown in vivo to serve as a diet-responsive neurogenic niche. The targeted neurons in the hypothalamus are in the arcuate nucleus, the ventromedial nucleus, and the dorsomedial nucleus.The neurons contacted by the tanycyte processes include orexigenic, and anorexigenic neurons that control energy balance.

Studies suggests that tanycyte cells bridge the gap between the central nervous system (CNS) via cerebrospinal fluid (CSF) to the hypophyseal portal blood. Tanycytes provide a link that is both structural and functional between the CSF and the perivascular space of the hypophyseal portal vessels. Unlike regular ependymal cells there are tight junctions between them, and between their adjacent ependymal cells. There are also desmosomes present which together with the tight junctions provide structural support.

=== Role in the release of gonadotropin-releasing hormone ===
Researches in 2005 and 2010 found that tanycytes participate in the release of gonadotropin-releasing hormone (GnRH). GnRH is released by GnRH neurons located in the arcuate nucleus in the hypothalamus. These nerve fibers are concentrated in the region that exactly matches the distribution of β1 tanycytes. β1 and β2 tanycytes are found nearer the arcuate nucleus and the median eminence.

== See also ==
List of distinct cell types in the adult human body
