= Lateral hypothalamus =

Brain region

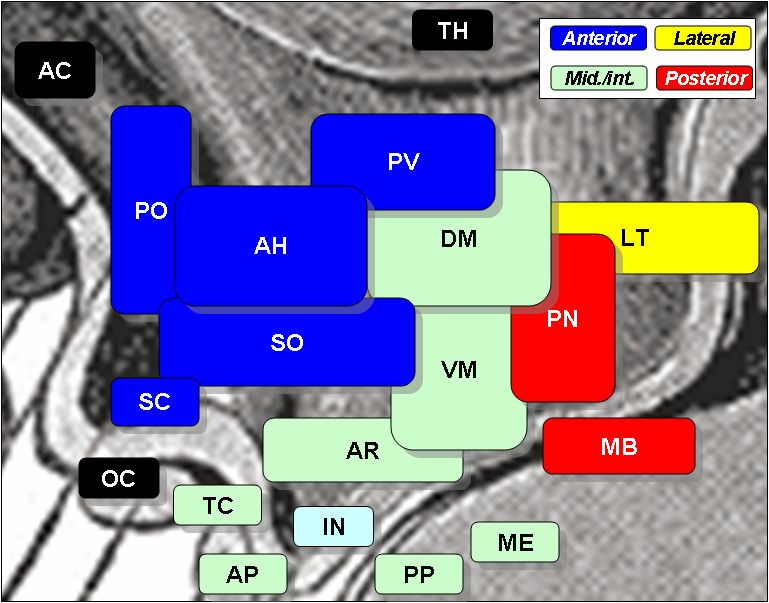
- Lateral hypothalamus is 'LT', at right, in yellow.

Identifiers
- MeSH: D007026
- NeuroNames: 426
- NeuroLex ID: birnlex_4037
- TA98: A14.1.08.929
- FMA: 62030

The lateral hypothalamus (LH), also called the lateral hypothalamic area (LHA), contains the primary orexinergic nucleus within the hypothalamus that widely projects throughout the nervous system; this system of neurons mediates an array of cognitive and physical processes, such as promoting feeding behavior and arousal, reducing pain perception, and regulating body temperature, digestive functions, and blood pressure, among many others. Clinically significant disorders that involve dysfunctions of the orexinergic projection system include narcolepsy, motility disorders or functional gastrointestinal disorders involving visceral hypersensitivity (e.g., irritable bowel syndrome), and eating disorders.

The neurotransmitter glutamate and the endocannabinoids (e.g., anandamide) and the orexin neuropeptides orexin-A and orexin-B are the primary signaling neurochemicals in orexin neurons; pathway-specific neurochemicals include GABA, melanin-concentrating hormone, nociceptin, glucose, the dynorphin peptides, and the appetite-regulating peptide hormones leptin and ghrelin, among others. Notably, cannabinoid receptor 1 (CB1) is colocalized on orexinergic projection neurons in the lateral hypothalamus and many output structures, where the CB1 and orexin receptor 1 (OX1) receptors form the CB1–OX1 receptor heterodimer.

== Inputs ==
- Medial prefrontal cortex
- Central nucleus of the amygdala
- Bed Nucleus of the Stria Terminalis (BNST)

== Outputs ==
The orexinergic projections from the lateral hypothalamus innervate the entirety of the remainder of the hypothalamus, with robust projections to the posterior hypothalamus, tuberomammillary nucleus (the histamine projection nucleus), the arcuate nucleus, and the paraventricular hypothalamic nucleus. In addition to the histaminergic nucleus, the orexin system also projects onto the ventral tegmental area dopamine nucleus, locus ceruleus noradrenergic nucleus, the serotonergic raphe nuclei, and cholinergic pedunculopontine nucleus and laterodorsal tegmental nucleus. The histaminergic, dopaminergic, serotonergic, noradrenergic, and cholinergic nuclei which the lateral hypothalamic orexin neurons project onto constitute the primary components of the ascending reticular activating system.

Other output regions include: the ventromedial hypothalamus, medial and lateral septal nuclei, central medial amygdala, zona incerta, periaqueductal gray matter, lateral habenula, diagonal band, substantia innominata (contains the nucleus basalis), stria terminalis, prefrontal cortex, various brain stem substructures, including the rostral ventromedial medulla, rostral ventrolateral medulla, nucleus ambiguus, solitary nucleus, spinal trigeminal nucleus, pontine micturition center, ventral respiratory group, and pontine respiratory group), area postrema, and dorsal nucleus of vagus nerve.

Cannabinoid receptor 1 (CB1) is colocalized on orexinergic projection neurons in the lateral hypothalamus and many output structures, where the CB1 and orexin receptor 1 (OX1) receptors physically and functionally join to form the CB1–OX1 receptor heterodimer. There is substantial anatomical and functional overlap and systemic cross-talk between the endocannabinoid system and orexin system within the central nervous system.

== Function ==
Through the diverse outputs of the orexin system, the orexin neurons in the lateral hypothalamus mediate an array of functions. Two of the most commonly noted functions of orexin peptides in the lateral hypothalamus are the promotion of feeding behavior and arousal (i.e., wakefulness). More generally, the orexinergic neural projections of the lateral hypothalamus are involved in thermoregulation, regulating gastrointestinal motility and gastrointestinal function by way of the dorsal nucleus of the vagus nerve, reducing pain and nociception through several output structures (e.g., periaqueductal gray matter), modulating the rewarding property of stimuli through the ventral tegmental area projections and other outputs in the reward system, regulating energy homeostasis and neuroendocrine functions (e.g., HPA axis, HPG axis, and HPT axis) through other hypothalamic outputs, and regulating visceral functions (e.g., respiration, blood pressure, and urination) via a group of structures in the brain stem, among other functions.

The endocannabinoid system and the orexin system mediate many of the same cognitive and physical effects, and a significant overlap in their function and localization has been noted in a 2013 medical review; the CB1–OX1 receptor heterodimer produces a 100-fold amplification of the potency of the orexin receptor 1-mediated ERK pathway signaling. Unique functional interactions have been noted as well, such as an OX1-induced CB1 pressor response in the rostral ventrolateral medulla.

== Clinical significance ==
Narcolepsy is associated with a marked reduction in the number of orexinergic projection neurons from the lateral hypothalamus and very low orexin peptides in cerebrospinal fluid. This has been identified as the mechanism responsible for narcoleptic symptoms.

Evidence suggest that OX1 neurons that synapse onto the dorsal nucleus of the vagus nerve and parts of the brain stem may play a role in the pathophysiology of chronic pain and visceral hypersensitivity in functional gastrointestinal disorders.
