= Periventricular =

Periventricular means around the ventricle and may refer to:

- Periventricular leukomalacia, a disease characterized by the death of the white matter near the cerebral ventricles
- Periventricular nucleus, a composite structure of the hypothalamus
