= TRH (disambiguation) =

The abbreviation TRH can refer to

- Thyrotropin-releasing hormone
- Their Royal Highnesses, style when referring to several royals
- The Right Honourable, honorific style applied to certain persons in the Commonwealth of Nations
