= Hypothalamic–pituitary–adrenal axis =

Set of physiological feedback interactions

Schematic of the HPA axis (CRH, corticotropin-releasing hormone; ACTH, adrenocorticotropic hormone)

Hypothalamus, pituitary gland, and adrenal cortex

The hypothalamic–pituitary–adrenal axis (HPA axis) is a neuroendocrine axis that controls the secretion of corticosteroid stress hormones. The HPA axis has three components: the hypothalamus (a part of the brain located below the thalamus), the pituitary gland (a pea-shaped structure located below the hypothalamus), and the adrenal (also called "suprarenal") glands (small, conical organs on top of the kidneys). These structures and their interactions constitute the HPA axis.

The HPA axis is a major neuroendocrine system that controls reactions to stress and regulates many body processes, including digestion, immune responses, mood and emotions, sexual activity, and energy storage and expenditure. It is the common mechanism for interactions among glands, hormones, and parts of the midbrain that mediate the general adaptation syndrome (GAS).

While steroid hormones are produced mainly in vertebrates, the physiological role of the HPA axis and corticosteroids in stress response is so fundamental that analogous systems can be found in invertebrates and monocellular organisms as well.

The HPA axis, hypothalamic–pituitary–gonadal (HPG) axis, hypothalamic–pituitary–thyroid (HPT) axis, and the hypothalamic–neurohypophyseal system are the four major neuroendocrine systems through which the hypothalamus and pituitary direct neuroendocrine function.

== Anatomy ==
The key elements of the HPA axis are:

- The paraventricular nucleus of the hypothalamus: It contains neuroendocrine neurons which synthesize and secrete vasopressin and corticotropin-releasing hormone (CRH).
- The anterior lobe of the pituitary gland: CRH and vasopressin stimulate the anterior lobe of pituitary gland to secrete adrenocorticotropic hormone (ACTH), once known as corticotropin.
- The adrenal cortex: It produces glucocorticoid hormones (mainly cortisol in humans) in response to stimulation by ACTH. Glucocorticoids in turn, act back on the hypothalamus and pituitary (to suppress CRH and ACTH production) in a negative feedback cycle.

CRH and vasopressin are released from neurosecretory nerve terminals at the median eminence. CRH is transported to the anterior pituitary through the portal blood vessel system of the hypophyseal stalk and vasopressin is transported by axonal transport to the posterior pituitary gland. There, CRH and vasopressin act synergistically to stimulate the secretion of stored ACTH from corticotrope cells. ACTH is transported by the blood to the adrenal cortex of the adrenal gland, where it rapidly stimulates the biosynthesis of corticosteroids such as cortisol from cholesterol. Cortisol is a major stress hormone and has effects on many tissues in the body, including the brain. In the brain, cortisol acts on two types of receptors: mineralocorticoid receptors and glucocorticoid receptors, and these are expressed by many different types of neurons. One important target of glucocorticoids is the hypothalamus, which is a major controlling centre of the HPA axis.

Vasopressin can be thought of as "water conservation hormone" and is also known as "antidiuretic hormone(ADH)". It is released when the body is dehydrated and has potent water-conserving effects on the kidney. It is also a potent vasoconstrictor.

Important to the function of the HPA axis are some of the following feedback loops:

- Cortisol produced in the adrenal cortex will negatively feedback to inhibit both the hypothalamus and the pituitary gland. This reduces the secretion of CRH and vasopressin, and also directly reduces the cleavage of proopiomelanocortin (POMC) into ACTH and β-endorphins.
- Epinephrine and norepinephrine (E/NE) are produced by the adrenal medulla through sympathetic stimulation and the local effects of cortisol (upregulation enzymes to make E/NE). E/NE will positively feedback to the pituitary and increase the breakdown of POMCs into ACTH and β-endorphins.

== Function ==
Release of corticotropin-releasing hormone (CRH) from the hypothalamus is influenced by stress, physical activity, illness, by blood levels of cortisol and by the sleep/wake cycle (circadian rhythm). In healthy individuals, cortisol rises rapidly after wakening, reaching a peak within 30–45 minutes. It then gradually falls over the day, reaching a trough during the middle of the night. This corresponds to the rest-activity cycle of the organism. An abnormally flattened circadian cortisol cycle has been linked with chronic fatigue syndrome, insomnia and burnout.

The HPA axis has a central role in regulating many homeostatic systems in the body, including the metabolic system, cardiovascular system, immune system, reproductive system and central nervous system. The HPA axis integrates physical and psychosocial influences in order to allow an organism to adapt effectively to its environment, use resources, and optimize survival.

Anatomical connections between brain areas such as the amygdala, hippocampus, prefrontal cortex and hypothalamus facilitate activation of the HPA axis. Sensory information arriving at the lateral aspect of the amygdala is processed and conveyed to the amygdala's central nucleus, which then projects out to several parts of the brain involved in responses to fear. At the hypothalamus, fear-signaling impulses activate both the sympathetic nervous system and the modulating systems of the HPA axis.

Increased production of cortisol during stress results in an increased availability of glucose in order to facilitate fighting or fleeing. As well as directly increasing glucose availability, cortisol also suppresses the highly demanding metabolic processes of the immune system, resulting in further availability of glucose.

Glucocorticoids have many important functions, including modulation of stress reactions, but in excess they can be damaging. Atrophy of the hippocampus in humans and animals exposed to severe stress is believed to be caused by prolonged exposure to high concentrations of glucocorticoids. Deficiencies of the hippocampus may reduce the memory resources available to help a body formulate appropriate reactions to stress.

== Immune system ==
There is bi-directional communication and feedback between the HPA axis and the immune system. A number of cytokines, such as IL-1, IL-6, IL-10 and TNF-alpha can activate the HPA axis, although IL-1 is the most potent. The HPA axis in turn modulates the immune response, with high levels of cortisol resulting in a suppression of immune and inflammatory reactions. This helps to protect the organism from a lethal overactivation of the immune system, and minimizes tissue damage from inflammation.

In many ways, the CNS is "immune privileged", but it plays an important role in the immune system and is affected by it in turn. The CNS regulates the immune system through neuroendocrine pathways, such as the HPA axis. The HPA axis is responsible for modulating inflammatory responses that occur throughout the body.

During an immune response, proinflammatory cytokines (e.g. IL-1) are released into the peripheral circulation system and can pass through the blood–brain barrier where they can interact with the brain and activate the HPA axis. Interactions between the proinflammatory cytokines and the brain can alter the metabolic activity of neurotransmitters and cause symptoms such as fatigue, depression, and mood changes. Deficiencies in the HPA axis may play a role in allergies and inflammatory/ autoimmune diseases, such as rheumatoid arthritis and multiple sclerosis.

When the HPA axis is activated by stressors, such as an immune response, high levels of glucocorticoids are released into the body and suppress immune response by inhibiting the expression of proinflammatory cytokines (e.g. IL-1, TNF alpha, and IFN gamma) and increasing the levels of anti-inflammatory cytokines (e.g. IL-4, IL-10, and IL-13) in immune cells, such as monocytes and neutrophils.

The relationship between chronic stress and its concomitant activation of the HPA axis, and dysfunction of the immune system is unclear; studies have found both immunosuppression and hyperactivation of the immune response.

== Stress ==
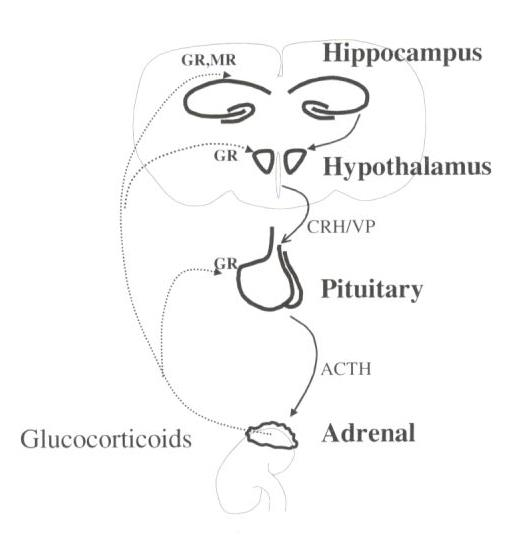
Schematic overview of the hypothalamic-pituitary-adrenal (HPA) axis. Stress activates the HPA-axis and thereby enhances the secretion of glucocorticoids from the adrenals.

Activation of the HPA axis causes release of glucocorticoids, which target numerous organ systems to activate energy reserves in response to stress demands. The HPA stress response is controlled mostly by neural mechanisms, which cause release of corticotrophin releasing hormone (CRH) from the hypothalamus. Neural mechanisms determining responses to chronic stress are different from those that control acute reactions. Individual responses to acute or chronic stress are determined by multiple factors, including age, gender, genetics, environmental factors, and early life experiences.

=== Stress and development ===
==== Prenatal stress ====
There is evidence that prenatal stress can influence HPA regulation. In humans, prolonged maternal stress during gestation is associated with mild impairment of intellectual activity and language development in their children, and with behavior disorders such as attention deficits, schizophrenia, anxiety and depression; self-reported maternal stress is associated with a higher irritability, emotional and attentional problems.

There is evidence that prenatal stress can affect HPA regulation in humans. Children who were stressed prenatally may show altered cortisol rhythms. Prenatal stress has also been implicated in a tendency toward depression and short attention span in childhood. During pregnancy, maternal stress is often associated with an increase in levels of glucocorticoids, specifically cortisol, which can travel through the placenta and affect the developmental trajectory of the fetal neuroendocrine.

These hormonal exposures can shape the offspring’s stress regulation system over the long term, leading to altered cortisol activity patterns and dysregulated circadian rhythms in childhood. In addition, the timing of stress exposure during gestation can play a crucial role as a spike in maternal cortisol early in pregnancy has a negative correlational relationship with cognitive development in infants.

Alterations in the structure and function of brain areas related to emotional and cognitive processing, such as the amygdala and the prefrontal cortex, have been related to prenatal stress.

==== Early life stress ====
Exposure to mild or moderate stressors early in life has been shown to enhance HPA regulation and promote a lifelong resilience to stress. In contrast, early-life exposure to extreme or prolonged stress can induce a hyper-reactive HPA axis and may contribute to lifelong vulnerability to stress.

Adult survivors of childhood abuse have exhibited increased ACTH concentrations in response to a psychosocial stress task compared to unaffected controls and subjects with depression, but not childhood abuse.

The HPA axis was present in the earliest vertebrate species, and has remained highly conserved by strong positive selection due to its critical adaptive roles. The programming of the HPA axis is strongly influenced by the perinatal and early juvenile environment, or "early-life environment". Maternal stress and differential degrees of caregiving may constitute early life adversity, which has been shown to profoundly influence, if not permanently alter, the offspring's stress and emotional regulating systems.

== See also ==
Other major neuroendocrine systems

- Hypothalamic–neurohypophyseal system
- Hypothalamic–pituitary–gonadal axis
- Hypothalamic–pituitary–thyroid axis

Related topics

- ACTH stimulation test
- Allostatic load
- Antidepressants
- Cortisol awakening response
- Dexamethasone
- Dexamethasone suppression test
- Fight-or-flight response
- Hydrocortisone
- Major depressive disorder
- Psychoneuroendocrinology
- Sickness behavior

Conditions

- Addison's disease
- Adrenal insufficiency
- Cushing's syndrome
