= Arcuate nucleus (hypothalamus) =

Neuron cluster in the hypothalamus

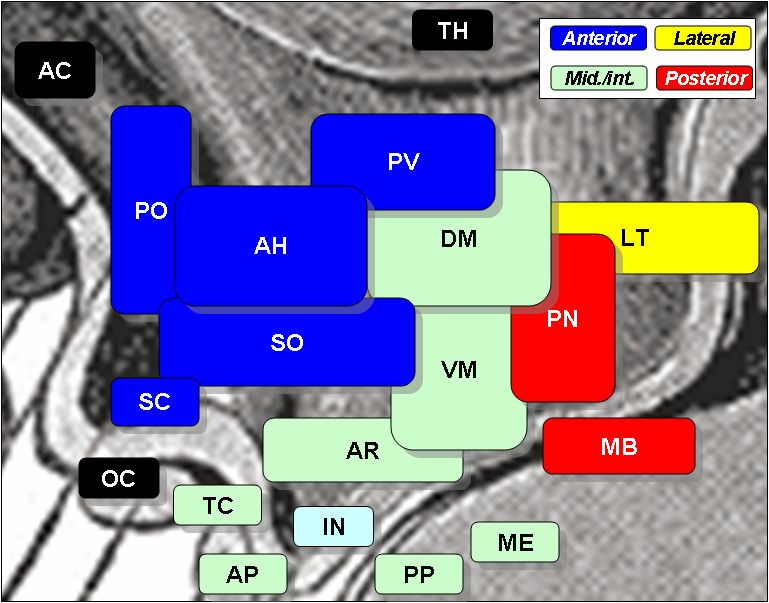
- Arcuate nucleus is 'AR', at bottom center, in green.

Details
- Part of: Hypothalamus

Identifiers
- Latin: nucleus arcuatus hypothalami, nucleus infundibularis hypothalami, nucleus semilunaris hypothalami
- MeSH: D001111
- NeuroNames: 395
- NeuroLex ID: birnlex_1638
- TA98: A14.1.08.923
- TA2: 5726
- FMA: 62329

The arcuate nucleus of the hypothalamus (ARH), or ARC, is also known as the infundibular nucleus to distinguish it from the arcuate nucleus of the medulla oblongata in the brainstem. The arcuate nucleus is an aggregation of neurons in the mediobasal hypothalamus, adjacent to the third ventricle and the median eminence. The arcuate nucleus includes several important and diverse populations of neurons that help mediate different neuroendocrine and physiological functions, including neuroendocrine neurons, centrally projecting neurons, and astrocytes. The populations of neurons found in the arcuate nucleus are based on the hormones they secrete or interact with and are responsible for hypothalamic function, such as regulating hormones released from the pituitary gland or secreting their own hormones. Neurons in this region are also responsible for integrating information and providing inputs to other nuclei in the hypothalamus or inputs to areas outside this region of the brain. These neurons, generated from the ventral part of the periventricular epithelium during embryonic development, locate dorsally in the hypothalamus, becoming part of the ventromedial hypothalamic region. The function of the arcuate nucleus relies on its diversity of neurons, but its central role is involved in homeostasis. The arcuate nucleus provides many physiological roles involved in feeding, metabolism, fertility, and cardiovascular regulation.

== Cell populations ==
=== Neuroendocrine neurons ===
Different groups of arcuate nucleus neuroendocrine neurons secrete various types or combinations of neurotransmitters and neuropeptides, such as neuropeptide Y (NPY), gonadotropin-releasing hormone (GnRH), agouti-related peptide (AgRP), cocaine- and amphetamine-regulated transcript (CART), kisspeptin, dopamine, substance P, growth hormone–releasing hormone (GHRH), neurokinin B (NKB), β-endorphin, melanocyte-stimulating hormone (MSH), and somatostatin. Proopiomelanocortin (POMC) is a precursor polypeptide that is cleaved into MSH, ACTH, and β-endorphin and expressed in the arcuate nucleus.

Groups of neuroendocrine neurons include:

- TIDA neurons, or tuberoinfundibular dopamine neurons, regulate the secretion of prolactin from the pituitary gland and release the neurotransmitter dopamine. TIDA neurons have nerve endings in the median eminence that release dopamine into the hypophysial portal blood. In lactating females, TIDA neurons are inhibited by the stimulus of suckling. Dopamine released from their nerve endings at the median eminence is transported to the anterior pituitary gland, where it regulates the secretion of prolactin. Dopamine inhibits prolactin secretion, so when the TIDA neurons are inhibited, there is increased secretion of prolactin, which stimulates lactogenesis (milk production). Prolactin acts in a short-loop negative feedback manner to decrease its levels by stimulating the release of dopamine. Dopaminergic neurons of the arcuate also inhibit the release of gonadotropin-releasing hormone, explaining in part why lactating (or otherwise hyperprolactinemic) women experience oligomenorrhea or amenorrhea (infrequency or absence of menses).
- Kisspeptin/NKB neurons within the arcuate nucleus form synaptic inputs with TIDA neurons. These neurons express estrogen receptors and also coexpress neurokinin B in female rats.
- GHRH neurons help to control growth hormone (GH) secretion in conjunction with somatostatin and NPY.
- NPY/AgRP neurons and POMC/CART neurons make up two groups of neurons in the arcuate nucleus that are centrally involved in the neuroendocrine function of feeding. Medial neurons utilize NPY peptides as neurotransmitters to stimulate appetite, and lateral neurons utilize POMC/CART to inhibit appetite. NPY and POMC/CART neurons are sensitive to peripheral hormones such as leptin and insulin. POMC/CART neurons also secrete melanocyte-stimulating hormone, which suppresses appetite.
- GnRH neurons have also been found. These neurons secrete GnRH and histamine.
- There are also groups of neurons expressing NKB and dynorphin that help to control reproduction.

=== Centrally-projecting neurons ===
Other types of neurons have projection pathways from the arcuate nucleus to mediate different regions of the hypothalamus or to other regions outside of the hypothalamus. Projections of these neurons extend a long distance from the arcuate nucleus to the median eminence to influence the release of hormones from the pituitary gland. Neurons of the arcuate nucleus have intrahypothalamic projections for neuroendocrine circuitry. These neural projections that influence feeding behavior project to the paraventricular nucleus of the hypothalamus (PVH), the dorsomedial hypothalamic nucleus (DMH), and the lateral hypothalamic area (LHA). Populations of neurons connect to the intermediate lobes of the pituitary gland, from the lateral division of the ARH to the neural and intermediate parts of the pituitary gland, and the caudal division of ARH to the median eminence.

Groups of neurons that project elsewhere within the central nervous system include:

- Centrally projecting neurons that contain neuropeptide Y (NPY), agouti-related protein (AGRP), and the inhibitory neurotransmitter GABA. These neurons, in the most ventromedial part of the nucleus, project strongly to the lateral hypothalamus and to the paraventricular nucleus of the hypothalamus, and are important in the regulation of appetite. When activated, these neurons can produce ravenous eating. These neurons are inhibited by leptin, insulin, and peptide YY and activated by ghrelin.
- Centrally projecting neurons that contain peptide products of pro-opiomelanocortin (POMC), and cocaine- and amphetamine-regulated transcript (CART). These neurons have widespread projections to many brain areas, including to all nuclei in the hypothalamus. These cells are important in the regulation of appetite, and, when activated, they inhibit feeding. These neurons are activated by circulating concentrations of leptin and insulin, and they are directly innervated and inhibited by the NPY neurons. POMC neurons that project to the medial preoptic nucleus are also involved in the regulation of sexual behavior in both males and females. The expression of POMC is regulated by gonadal steroids. The release of a POMC product, beta-endorphin is regulated by NPY.
- Centrally projecting neurons that make somatostatin; the neurosecretory somatostatin neurons that regulate growth hormone secretion are a different population, located in the periventricular nucleus.
- Feeding regulatory neurons also activate oxytocin-containing neurons of the periventricular nucleus (PVN), which projects to nucleus of tractus solitarius in the medulla oblongata.
- Others receive direct synaptic inputs from extra hypothalamic sites projecting into the amygdala, the hippocampus, and the entorhinal cortex.

=== Other cells ===
Other cell populations include:

- A small population of neurons sensitive to ghrelin. The role of this population is not known; many neurons in the arcuate nucleus express receptors for ghrelin, but these are thought to respond mainly to blood-borne ghrelin.
- The arcuate nucleus is also contacted by the processes of specialized ependymal cells, called tanycytes.
- Astrocytes in the arcuate nucleus hold high capacity glucose transporters that function as nutrient sensors for appetite controlling neurons
- The diverse and specialized collections of neurons reside within a special compartment with glial cells and have their own network of capillaries and a membrane of tanycytes that help create a blood brain barrier. Circulating or molecules such as hormones travel in the blood and can directly affect these neurons and their plasticity as evidence by adult neurogenesis.

== Footnotes ==
- Kawano H, Daikoku S (May 1988). "Somatostatin-containing neuron systems in the rat hypothalamus: retrograde tracing and immunohistochemical studies". The Journal of Comparative Neurology. 271 (2): 293–9. doi:10.1002/cne.902710209. PMID 2897982. S2CID 23815658.
- Cone RD (May 2005). "Anatomy and regulation of the central melanocortin system" (PDF). Nature Neuroscience. 8 (5): 571–8. doi:10.1038/nn1455. PMID 15856065. S2CID 13400886.
- Abizaid A, Horvath TL (August 2008). "Brain circuits regulating energy homeostasis". Regulatory Peptides. 149 (1–3): 3–10. doi:10.1016/j.regpep.2007.10.006. PMC 2605273. PMID 18514925.
