= Dorsomedial nucleus =

Dorsomedial nucleus can refer to:

- Dorsomedial hypothalamic nucleus
- Medial dorsal nucleus of the thalamus
