= Natural neuroactive substance =

A natural neuroactive substance (NAS) is a chemical synthesized by neurons that affects the actions of other neurons or muscle cells. Natural neuroactive substances include neurotransmitters, neurohormones, and neuromodulators. Neurotransmitters work only between adjacent neurons through synapses. Neurohormones are released into the blood and work at a distance. Some natural neuroactive substances act as both transmitters and as hormones.
