= Parvocellular neurosecretory cell =

Neurons that produce hypothalamic releasing and inhibiting hormones

Parvocellular neurosecretory cells are small neurons that produce hypothalamic releasing and inhibiting hormones. The cell bodies of these neurons are located in various nuclei of the hypothalamus or in closely related areas of the basal brain, mainly in the medial zone of the hypothalamus. The majority of the axons of the parvocellular neurosecretory cells project to the median eminence, at the base of the brain, where their nerve terminals release the hypothalamic hormones. These hormones are then diffuse into the blood vessels of the hypothalamo-pituitary portal system, which carry them to the anterior pituitary gland, where they regulate the secretion of hormones into the systemic circulation.

== Types ==
The parvocellular neurosecretory cells include those that make:

- Thyrotropin-releasing hormone (TRH), which acts as the primary regulator of TSH release
- Corticotropin-releasing hormone (CRH), which acts as the primary regulator of ACTH
- Growth hormone-releasing hormone (GHRH), which acts as the primary regulator of growth hormone release
- Somatostatin, which acts as a regulator of growth hormone release
- Gonadotropin-releasing hormone (GnRH), which acts as the primary regulator of luteinizing hormone (LH) and follicle-stimulating hormone (FSH) release
- Dopamine, which acts as the primary regulator of prolactin release

== See also ==
- Paraventricular nucleus
- Magnocellular neurosecretory cell
- List of distinct cell types in the adult human body
