= Releasing and inhibiting hormones =

Hormones that stimulate or inhibit release of other hormones

Releasing hormones and inhibiting hormones are hormones (signaling molecules) whose main purpose is to control the release of other hormones, either by stimulating or inhibiting their release. They are also called liberins (/ˈlɪbərɪnz/) and statins (/ˈstætɪnz/) (respectively), or releasing factors and inhibiting factors. The principal examples are hypothalamic-pituitary hormones that can be classified from several viewpoints: they are hypothalamic hormones (originating in the hypothalamus), they are hypophysiotropic hormones (affecting the hypophysis, that is, the pituitary gland), and they are tropic hormones (having other endocrine glands as their target).

For example, thyrotropin-releasing hormone (TRH) is released from the hypothalamus in response to low levels of secretion of thyroid-stimulating hormone (TSH) from the pituitary gland. The TSH in turn is under feedback control by the thyroid hormones T4 and T3. When the level of TSH is too high, they feed back on the brain to shut down the secretion of TRH. Synthetic TRH is also used by physicians as a test of TSH reserve in the pituitary gland as it should stimulate the release of TSH and prolactin from this gland.

The main releasing hormones are as follows:

- The hypothalamus uses thyrotropin-releasing hormone (TRH or thyroliberin) to tell the pituitary to release thyrotropin.
- The hypothalamus uses corticotropin-releasing hormone (CRH or corticoliberin) to tell the pituitary to release corticotropin.
- The hypothalamus uses gonadotropin-releasing hormone (GnRH or gonadoliberin) to tell the pituitary to release gonadotropin.
- The hypothalamus uses growth hormone–releasing hormone (GHRH or somatoliberin) to tell the pituitary to release somatotropin.

The main release-inhibiting hormones or inhibiting hormones are as follows:

- The hypothalamus uses somatostatin to tell the pituitary to inhibit somatotropin and to tell the gastrointestinal tract to inhibit various gastrointestinal hormones.

There are various other inhibiting factors that also have tropic endocrine inhibition activity. Such activity is only one of many functions that they have (such as neurotransmitter and receptor antagonist roles), and they are not always called hormones, although many are neuropeptides or neurosteroids. They include the following:

- The hypothalamus uses dopamine as a prolactostatin to tell the pituitary to inhibit prolactin; it is also created elsewhere in the brain and the adrenal cortex as a neurotransmitter to affect many other systems.
- The hypothalamus uses RFRP-3 in mammals or GnIH in avian species to inhibit GnRH.
- The hypothalamus uses follistatin to tell the pituitary to inhibit follicle-stimulating hormone; it also has many other systemic effects.
- Myocytes use myostatin to tell each other to inhibit myogenesis.
- Melanocyte-inhibiting factor (melanostatin) inhibits release of other neuropeptides such as alpha-MSH and also has many other functions.
- There is a neuropeptide called cortistatin and a class of steroidal cortistatins.

Examples of releasing and inhibiting hormones for exocrine hormones are gastrin-releasing peptide (GRP) and gastric inhibitory polypeptide (GIP), which regulate gastrin production.

== Mechanism ==
Releasing hormones increase (or, in case of inhibitory factors, decrease) the intracellular concentration of calcium (Ca^{2+}), resulting in vesicle fusion of the respective primary hormone.

For GnRH, TRH and GHRH the increase in Ca^{2+} is achieved by the releasing hormone coupling and activating G protein coupled receptors coupled to the G_{q} alpha subunit, activating the IP3/DAG pathway to increase Ca^{2+}. For GHRH, however, this is a minor pathway, the main one being the cAMP dependent pathway.

== Notable researchers ==
Roger Guillemin and Andrew W. Schally were awarded the Nobel Prize in Physiology and Medicine in 1977 for their contributions to understanding "the peptide hormone production of the brain"; these scientists independently first isolated TRH and GnRH and then identified their structures.

== See also ==
- Neuroendocrinology
