= Posterior pituitary =

Posterior lobe of the pituitary gland

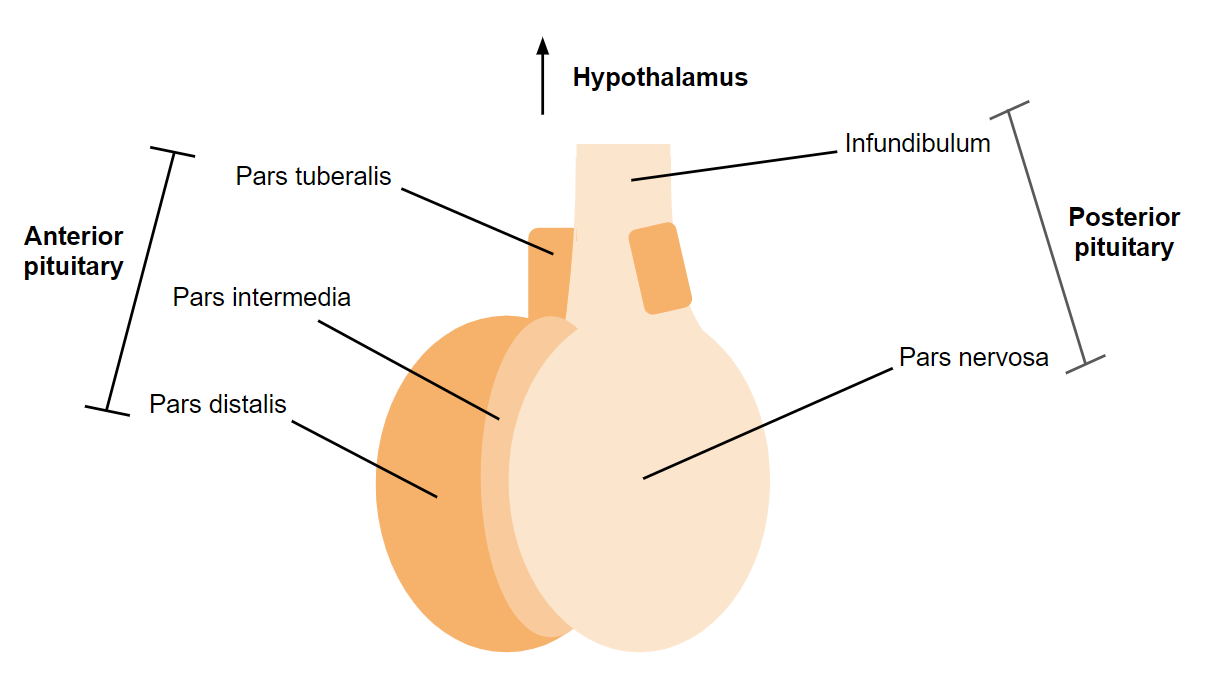
- Labeled diagram of the pituitary gland

Details
- Precursor: Neural tube (downward-growth of the diencephalon)
- Artery: Inferior hypophyseal artery
- Vein: Hypophyseal vein

Identifiers
- Latin: pars nervosa glandulae pituitariae, pars nervosa hypophyseos, lobus posterior hypophyseos
- MeSH: D010904
- NeuroNames: 401
- NeuroLex ID: birnlex_1586
- TA98: A11.1.00.006
- TA2: 3859
- FMA: 74636

The posterior pituitary (or neurohypophysis) is the posterior lobe of the pituitary gland which is part of the endocrine system. Unlike the anterior pituitary, the posterior pituitary is not glandular, but largely a collection of axonal projections from the hypothalamus that terminate behind the anterior pituitary, and serve as a site for the secretion of neurohypophysial hormones (oxytocin and vasopressin) directly into the blood. The hypothalamic–neurohypophyseal system is composed of the hypothalamus (the paraventricular nucleus and supraoptic nucleus), posterior pituitary, and these axonal projections.

== Structure ==
The posterior pituitary consists mainly of neuronal projections (axons) of magnocellular neurosecretory cells extending from the supraoptic and paraventricular nuclei of the hypothalamus. These axons store and release neurohypophysial hormones oxytocin and vasopressin into the neurohypophyseal capillaries, from there they get into the systemic circulation (and partly back into the hypophyseal portal system). In addition to axons, the posterior pituitary also contains pituicytes, specialized glial cells resembling astrocytes assisting in the storage and release of the hormones.

Classification of the posterior pituitary varies, but most sources include the two regions below:

=== Pars nervosa ===
Also called the neural lobe or posterior lobe, this region constitutes the majority of the posterior pituitary and is the storage site of oxytocin and vasopressin. Sometimes (incorrectly) considered synonymous with the posterior pituitary, the pars nervosa includes Herring bodies and pituicytes.

=== Infundibular stalk ===
Also known as the infundibulum or pituitary stalk, the infundibular stalk bridges the hypothalamic and hypophyseal systems.

The median eminence is only occasionally included as part of the posterior pituitary. Other sources specifically exclude it from the pituitary.

A few sources include the pars intermedia as part of the posterior lobe, but this is a minority view. It is based upon the gross anatomical separation of the posterior and anterior pituitary along the cystic remnants of Rathke's pouch, causing the pars intermedia to remain attached to the neurohypophysis.

== Function ==
=== Hormone secretion ===
Two hormones are classically considered as being related to the posterior pituitary: oxytocin and vasopressin. These hormones are created in the hypothalamus and released in the posterior pituitary. After creation, they are stored in neurosecretory vesicles regrouped into Herring bodies before being secreted in the posterior pituitary via the bloodstream.

Hormone	Other names	Symbol(s)	Main targets	Effect	Source
Oxytocin		OT, OXY	Uterus, mammary glands	Uterine contractions; lactation	supraoptic and paraventricular nuclei
Vasopressin	Arginine vasopressin, antidiuretic hormone	VP, AVP, ADH	Kidneys and arterioles	Stimulates water retention; raises blood pressure by contracting arterioles	supraoptic and paraventricular nuclei

== Clinical significance ==
Insufficient secretion of vasopressin underlies diabetes insipidus, a condition in which the body loses the capacity to concentrate urine. Affected individuals excrete as much as 20 liters of dilute urine per day. Oversecretion of vasopressin causes the syndrome of inappropriate antidiuretic hormone (SIADH).

== See also ==
- Anterior pituitary
- Hypothalamic–pituitary–adrenal axis
- Hypothalamic–pituitary–thyroid axis
- Hypothalamic–pituitary–gonadal axis
- Neurophysins

== Additional images ==
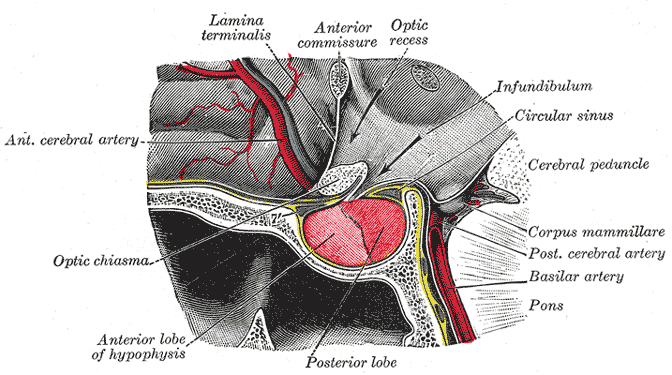
The posterior pituitary comprises the posterior lobe of the pituitary gland.
