= Magnocellular neurosecretory cell =

Large neuroendocrine cells of the hypothalamus

Magnocellular neurosecretory cells are large neuroendocrine cells within the supraoptic nucleus and paraventricular nucleus of the hypothalamus. They are also found in smaller numbers in accessory cell groups between these two nuclei, the largest one being the circular nucleus. There are two types of magnocellular neurosecretory cells, oxytocin-producing cells and vasopressin-producing cells, but a small number can produce both hormones. These cells are neuroendocrine neurons, are electrically excitable, and generate action potentials in response to afferent stimulation. Vasopressin is produced from the vasopressin-producing cells via the AVP gene, a molecular output of circadian pathways.

Magnocellular neurosecretory cells in rats (where these neurons have been most extensively studied) in general have a single long varicose axon, which projects to the posterior pituitary. Each axon gives rise to about 10,000 neurosecretory terminals and many axon swellings that store very large numbers of hormone-containing vesicles. These vesicles are released from the axon swellings and nerve terminals by exocytosis in response to calcium entry through voltage-gated ion channels, which occurs when action potentials are propagated down the axons.

The cells typically have two or three long dendrites, which also contain large dilations and a very high density of hormone-containing vesicles. Oxytocin and vasopressin can, thus, be released within the brain from these dendrites, as well as into the blood from the terminals in the posterior pituitary gland. However, the release of oxytocin and vasopressin from dendrites is not consistently accompanied by peripheral secretion, as dendritic release is regulated differently. Dendritic release can be triggered by depolarisation, but can also be triggered by the mobilisation of intracellular calcium stores. The dendrites receive most of the synaptic inputs from afferent neurons that regulate the magnocellular neurons; typically a magnocellular neuron receives about 10,000 synapses from afferent neurons.

The activity of magnocellular neurosecretory cells is regulated by local glial cells as well as through themselves (intrinsically). Their activity is also dependent on reproductive, osmotic, and cardiovascular inputs.

== See also ==
- Parvocellular neurosecretory cell
- List of distinct cell types in the adult human body
