= Dorsomedial hypothalamic nucleus =

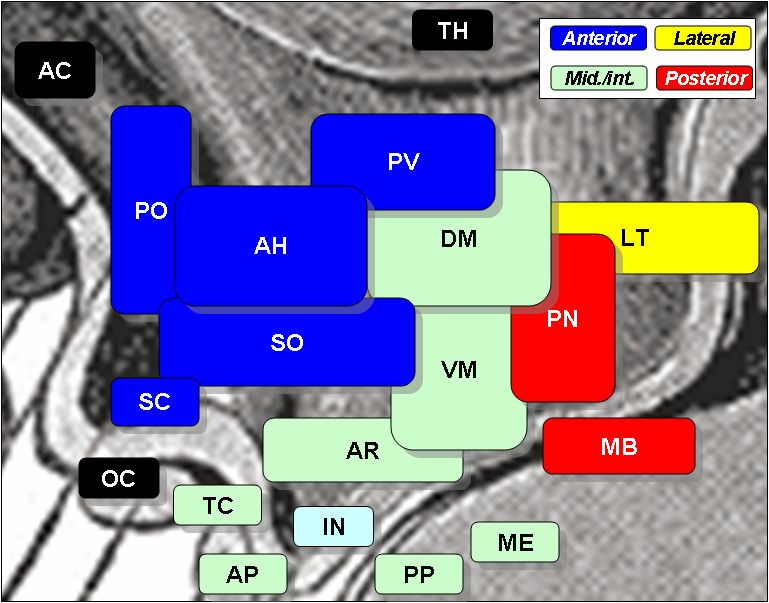
- Dorsomedial nucleus is 'DM', at center, in green.
- The dorsomedial hypothalamus of the mouse brain

Details

Identifiers
- Latin: nucleus dorsomedialis areae hypothalamicae intermediae
- MeSH: D004302
- NeuroNames: 397
- NeuroLex ID: birnlex_1558
- TA98: A14.1.08.917; A14.1.08.922
- TA2: 5728
- FMA: 62331

The dorsomedial hypothalamic nucleus is a nucleus of the hypothalamus. It is involved in feeding, drinking, body-weight regulation and circadian activity. More specifically, it is a necessary component for the expression of numerous behavioral and physiological circadian rhythms. The dorsomedial hypothalamic nucleus receives information from neurons and humors involved in feeding regulation, body weight and energy consumption, and then passes this information on to brain regions involved in sleep and wakefulness regulation, body temperature and corticosteroid secretion.

== Function ==
The dorsomedial hypothalamic nucleus (DMH) receives its circadian information from the suprachiasmatic nucleus, both directly and via subparaventricular zone, and senses leptin and other feeding cues, but it is also possible that it contains its own feeding-entrained oscillator (FEO). This still has yet to be proven in vitro. The DMH sends information to the ventrolateral preoptic area, locus coeruleus, and orexinergic neurons in order to aid in the regulation of wakefulness. The DMH is also involved in the regulation of hypothalamic outflow to the autonomic nervous and endocrine systems. Almost all major nuclei and areas of the hypothalamus feed information to the DMH.

The DMH is also known as a stress center. The inhibition of neuronal activation using muscimol in the DMH inhibited 85% of heart rate response and 68% of blood pressure response to air stress. This displays that the DMH plays a role in the increase of heart rate and blood pressure as cardiovascular responses to stress. Such sympathetic responses to psychological stress, including elevation of body temperature, are driven by a descending neural pathway from the DMH to sympathetic premotor neurons in the rostral raphe pallidus nucleus (rRPa) of the medulla oblongata. A study in 2020, discovered a psychosomatic neural pathway from the dorsal peduncular cortex (DP) in the medial prefrontal cortex to the DMH that drives a variety of physiological responses to psychological stress. The DMH is also a part of the pathway corticotrophin-releasing hormone (CRH) takes when it is secreted by the paraventricular nucleus of the hypothalamus, and it is involved in the flow from the sympathetic nervous system to the adrenal gland.

== Clinical significance ==
=== Damage ===
It was found in the study done by Gooley et al. that lesions in DMH neurons in rats prevented food entrainment of wakefulness, locomotor activity, and core body temperature. This further verifies its role in oscillation between feeding and circadian rhythm. Lesions in the DMH of rats also caused a weakened level of response to the feeding-stimulant insulin.
