= Ventromedial nucleus of the hypothalamus =

Nucleus of the hypothalamus

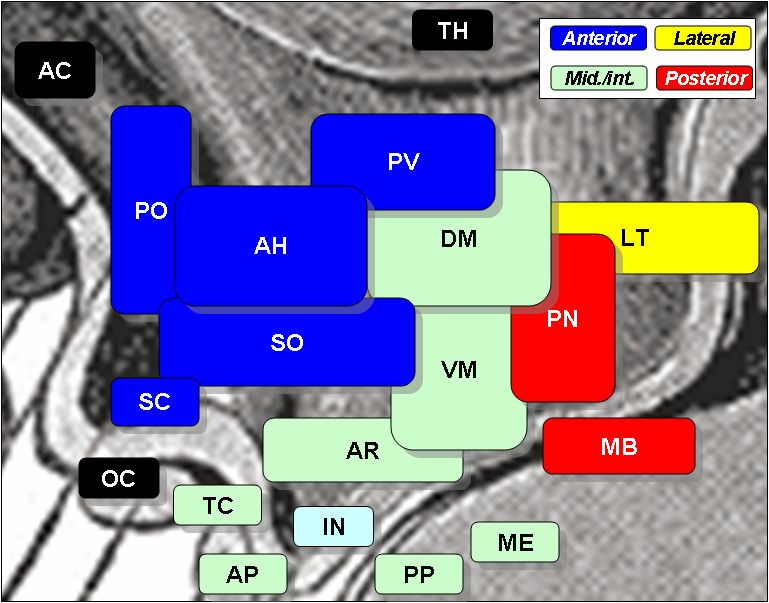
- Ventromedial nucleus is 'VM', at center, in green.

Details
- Part of: Hypothalamus
- Artery: Basilar

Identifiers
- Latin: nucleus ventromedialis hypothalami
- MeSH: D014697
- NeuroNames: 398
- NeuroLex ID: birnlex_1572
- TA98: A14.1.08.928
- TA2: 5729
- FMA: 62332

The ventromedial nucleus of the hypothalamus (VMN, VMH or ventromedial hypothalamus) is a nucleus of the hypothalamus. In 2007, Kurrasch et al. found that the ventromedial hypothalamus is a distinct morphological nucleus involved in terminating hunger, fear, thermoregulation, and sexual activity. This nuclear region is involved in the recognition of the feeling of fullness.

== Structure ==
It has four subdivisions:

- Anterior (VMHa)
- Dorsomedial (VMHdm)
- Ventrolateral (VMHvl)
- Central (VMHc)

These subdivisions differ anatomically, neurochemically, and behaviorally.

== Function ==
The ventromedial nucleus (VMN) is most commonly associated with satiety. Early studies showed that VMN lesions caused over-eating and obesity in rats. The interpretation of these experiments was questioned when Gold reported that precision-lesioning the VMN did not result in hyperphagia. Nevertheless, numerous studies have shown that the immediacy of hyperphagia and obesity syndrome are a consequence of VMN lesions or procaine injections, and point to the VMN's role in satiety. A major review of the subject in 2006 concluded that, "anatomical studies done both before and after Gold's study did not replicate his results with lesions, and in nearly every published direct comparison of VMH lesions vs. PVN or VNAB lesions, the group with VMH lesions ate substantially more food and gained twice as much weight." This strongly substantiates the classification of VMN as the primary satiety center in the hypothalamus.

It has also been found that lesions to the VMH in rats caused increased plasma insulin levels. Rats with a VMH lesion overproduce a circulating satiety factor (leptin) compared to normal rats, to which the control rats can respond but rats with a VMH lesion cannot, causing them to overeat (leading to obesity).

Researchers looked at a series of twenty-one animals of various degrees of adiposity, with respect to growth appearance, fat distribution, general physical condition, and the correlation between the level of adiposity attained and the correlation of the hypothalamic lesion. Lesions in the hypothalamic area, particularly the region of the ventromedial hypothalamus interrupts a large number of the descending fibers from the hypothalamic cell groups that were found to contribute to obesity in rats.

Another study found that there seems to be a higher concentration of cannabinoid receptor mRNA within the VMH in comparison to other nuclei within the hypothalamus. The cannabinoid ingestion has been linked to rewarding processes, and also with the release of dopamine in the brain.

VMH is also important in mammal play behaviour. Lesions to VMH along with the hippocampus, amygdala, the cerebellum, and the lateral hypothalamus are all linked to reduced play.

The VMHdm has a role in the male vocalizations and scent marking behaviors.

The VMHvl contains many distinct neuronal populations that contribute to varying, often distinct, functions. Notably, this region plays a role in sexual behaviors in females (lordosis), thus stimulating their sexual arousal. The VMHvl has also been found to play a role in estrogen-mediated movement and energy expenditure/thermogenesis.

Bilateral FOS expression in the VMH after repeated seizures is associated with alteration in the severity of flurothyl induced seizures in C57BL/6J mice that are not present in DBA/2J mice. Moreover, bilateral lesions of the VMH are able to block the propagation of seizure discharge to enter the brainstem seizure system.

== Surgery ==
In West Germany, at least 70 men had their VMN operated on between 1962 and 1979. Most of these individuals had been involuntarily institutionalized or imprisoned for deviant sexual behavior, such as homosexuality, perceived hypersexuality among heterosexual men, and pedophilia. This surgery was not commonly performed elsewhere.
