= Periventricular nucleus =

Details

Identifiers
- Latin: nucleus periventricularis
- TA98: A14.1.08.924
- TA2: 5711
- FMA: 84354

The periventricular nucleus is a thin sheet of small neurons located in the wall of the third ventricle, a composite structure of the hypothalamus. It functions in analgesia.

It is located in the rostral, intermediate, and caudal regions of the hypothalamus. The rostral region aids in the production of both somatostatin and thyroid releasing hormone. The intermediate portion aids in production of thyroid releasing hormone, somatostatin, leptin, gastrin, and neuropeptide Y. In humans and primates it also produces GnRH. Lastly the caudal region aids in sympathetic nervous system regulation, and is regarded as the rage center. The periventricular nucleus does not have an effective blood–brain barrier.

11β-HSD2 expression turns cortisol into cortisone.

== Role in LH and GnRH release ==
This nucleus has been shown to affect the release of GnRH (gonadotropin-releasing hormone) in several ways. One way is its expression of neuropeptide Y, which has an impact on the hypothalamic pathway responsible for GnRH secretion. The periventricular nucleus has also been shown to have many neurons that express kisspeptin, which generates a surge in LH, which ultimately leads to the release of GnRH. In female rats, there is a greater expression of estrogen receptor beta in the periventricular nuclear cells, which is thought to lead to different levels of LH secretion in males and females.

== Role in GH release ==
This region has been shown to aid in the production of somatostatin and research shows that neurons releasing somatostatin are stimulated to do so by glutamatergic innervation and then this allows them to inhibit the release of growth hormone. There is thought to be a differential level of secretion of somatostatin between males and females by the periventricular nucleus and that is thought to be responsible for the sexual dimorphism of growth hormone secretion. It has also been suggested that leptin secretion also plays a role in the release of GH from periventricular nucleus and that this hormone interacts with both somatostatin and growth hormone-releasing hormone (GHRH) in the GH release pathway. This is further supported by the presence of leptin receptors in neurons of the periventricular nucleus. GH may also be able to provide regulatory feedback on the periventricular nucleus by increasing cytokine signaling to the hypothalamus which inhibits the GH release pathway.

== See also ==
- Anteroventral periventricular nucleus
