= Median eminence =

Below the hypothalamus of the brain

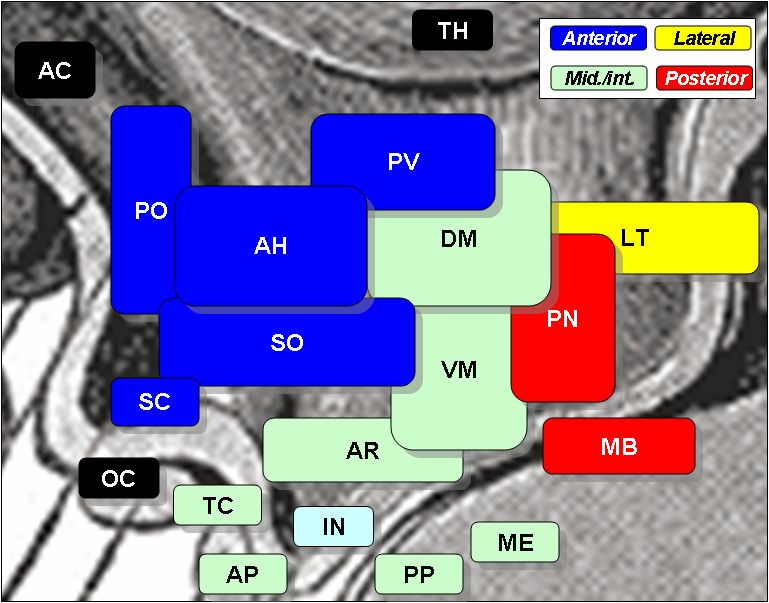
- Median eminence is 'ME', at bottom-center, in light-green

Details

Identifiers
- Latin: eminentia mediana hypothalami
- MeSH: D008473
- NeuroNames: 402
- NeuroLex ID: birnlex_925
- TA98: A14.1.08.409
- TA2: 5784
- FMA: 74634

The median eminence is generally defined as the portion of the ventral hypothalamus from which the portal vessels arise. The median eminence is a small swelling on the tuber cinereum, posterior to and on top of the pituitary stalk; it lies in the area roughly bounded on its posterolateral region by the cerebral peduncles, and on its anterolateral region by the optic chiasm.

As one of the seven areas of the brain devoid of a blood–brain barrier, the median eminence is a circumventricular organ having permeable capillaries. Its main function is as a gateway for release of hypothalamic hormones, although it does share contiguous perivascular spaces with the adjacent hypothalamic arcuate nucleus, indicating a potential sensory role.

== Physiology ==
The median eminence is a part of the hypothalamus from which regulatory hormones are released. It is integral to the hypophyseal portal system, which connects the hypothalamus with the pituitary gland. The pars nervosa (part of the posterior pituitary gland) is continuous with the median eminence via the infundibular stalk. Parvocellular neurosecretory cells from the hypothalamus terminate in the median eminence.

The median eminence is the structure where secretions of the hypothalamus (releasing and inhibiting hormones) regulatory hormones, known as "hypophysiotropic hormones") collect before entering the portal system emptying into the general circulation. Such hypophysiotropic hormones include: CRF (corticotropin-releasing factor), GnRH (gonadotropin-releasing hormone), TRH (thyrotropin-releasing hormone), GHRH (growth hormone-releasing hormone), and DA (dopamine). These hypophysiotropic hormones stimulate or inhibit the release of hormones from the anterior pituitary. Further, anatomical evidence exists for bidirectional communication between the median eminence and the arcuate and ventromedial nucleus of the hypothalamus.
