= Hypophyseal portal system =

System of blood vessels

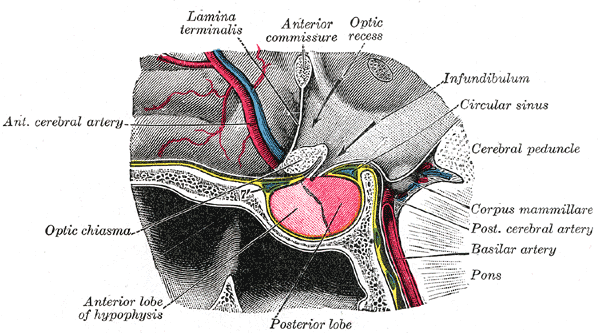

Details

Identifiers
- Latin: venae portales hypophysiales
- MeSH: D007030

The hypophyseal portal system is a system of blood vessels in the microcirculation at the base of the brain, connecting the hypothalamus with the anterior pituitary. Its main function is to quickly transport and exchange hormones between the hypothalamus arcuate nucleus and anterior pituitary gland. The capillaries in the portal system are fenestrated (have many small channels with high vascular permeability) which allows a rapid exchange between the hypothalamus and the pituitary. The main hormones transported by the system include gonadotropin-releasing hormone, corticotropin-releasing hormone, growth hormone–releasing hormone, and thyrotropin-releasing hormone.

== Structure ==
The blood supply and direction of flow in the hypophyseal portal system has been studied over many years on laboratory animals and human cadaver specimens with injection and vascular corrosion casting methods. Short portal vessels between the neural and anterior pituitary lobes provide an avenue for rapid hormonal exchange. Specifically within and between the pituitary lobes is anatomical evidence for confluent interlobe vessels, including venules providing blood from the anterior to the neural lobe, and capillary shunts exchanging blood between the intermediate and neural lobes. Such microvascular structures indicate moment-to-moment streams of information between lobes of the pituitary gland.

Results of other studies showed that the neural hypophyseal stalk and ventromedial region of the hypothalamic arcuate nucleus receive arterial blood from ascending and descending infundibular branches and capillaries, coming from arteries of the superior hypophyseal arterial system. Small ascending vessels arising from the anastomoses that connect the upper with the lower hypophyseal arterial system also supply blood to hypophyseal vessels. Many of these branches are continuous between the proximal arcuate nucleus and anterior pituitary, enabling rapid hormone exchange. Other evidence indicates that capillary perivascular spaces of the median eminence and arcuate nucleus are contiguous, potentially facilitating hormonal messages between systemic blood and the ventral hypothalamus.

=== Development ===
Proper hormone secretion is crucial for the growth of the developing fetus. In order to allow a controlled hormone secretion in the developing organs of the fetus, stimulating hormones must be exchanged in the regulating structures in the brain in early stages of the development. Hormone-exchanging blood vessels between the hypothalamus and the pituitary gland, similar to those of the hypophyseal portal system, can be observed in early developmental stages of the fetus. In the current literature, most research is conducted using mice as model species. In such studies, development of the hypophyseal portal system begins as early as 14.5 dpc (days post coitum). Two populations of pericytes arise from the mesoderm and the neuroectoderm and form at the approximate location of the portal system in what will eventually become the mature brain. Additionally, in research involving human fetuses it has been observed that the hypophyseal portal system fully develops by week 11.5 of the human fetal gestation period. This was determined by injecting a silicone rubber compound into specimens of various stages of gestation. In a specimen at week 11.5, the median eminence and infundibular stem contained the compound, suggesting the existence of the fully developed portal system. Further research in this area would help determine whether or not development could be complete at an even earlier stage.

== Function ==
Peptides released near the median eminence from hypothalamic nuclei are transported to the anterior pituitary, where they apply their effects. Branches from the internal carotid artery provide the blood supply to the pituitary. The superior hypophyseal arteries form the primary capillary plexus that supplies blood to the median eminence. From this capillary system, the blood is drained in hypophyseal portal veins into the secondary plexus. The peptides released at the median eminence enter the primary plexus capillaries. From there, they are transported to the anterior pituitary via hypophyseal portal veins to the secondary plexus. The secondary plexus is a network of fenestrated sinusoid capillaries that provide blood to the anterior pituitary. The cells of the anterior pituitary express specific G protein-coupled receptors that bind to the neuropeptides, activating intracellular second messenger cascades that produce the release of anterior pituitary hormones.

The following is a list of hormones that rely on the hypophyseal portal system to indirectly mediate their function by acting as a means of transportation from various nuclei of the hypothalamus to the anterior pituitary.

- Gonadotropin-releasing hormone (GnRH): regulates the release of follicle stimulating hormone and luteinizing hormone from the anterior pituitary; this pathway plays a critical role in reproductive activity and development
- Corticotropin-releasing hormone (CRH): regulates the release of adrenocorticotropic hormone from the anterior pituitary; this cascade is primarily responsible for stress responses
- Growth hormone-releasing hormone (GHRH): regulates the release of growth hormone from the anterior pituitary; as the name suggests, its main function is to help control cell growth, metabolism, and reproduction
- Thyrotropin-releasing hormone (TRH): regulates the release of thyroid-stimulating hormone from the anterior pituitary; functions to mediate various responses in the thyroid gland, including additional hormone synthesis

== Clinical significance ==
Over- or under-function as well as insufficiencies of the hypothalamus or the pituitary gland can cause a negative effect on the ability of the hypophyseal portal system to exchange hormones between both structures rapidly. This can have major effects on the respective target glands, making it impossible for them to carry out their functions properly. Occlusions and other issues in the blood vessels of the hypophysial portal system can also cause complications in the exchange of hormones between the hypothalamus and the pituitary gland.

The hypophyseal portal system also plays an important role in several diseases involving the pituitary and central nervous system. In several cases of hypophyseal and pituitary metastatic tumors, the portal system acts as the pathway for metastasis from the hypothalamus to the pituitary. That is, cancerous cells from the hypothalamus multiply and spread to the pituitary using the hypophyseal portal system as a means of transportation. However, because the portal system receives an indirect supply of arterial blood, tumor formation in the anterior pituitary is less likely than in the posterior pituitary. This is because the posterior pituitary is vascularized by direct arterial blood flow. Pituitary apoplexy is described as hemorrhaging or reduction of blood supply to the pituitary gland. The physiological mechanisms of this condition have not been clearly defined in current research. It has been suggested, nonetheless, that damage to the pituitary stalk leads to an obstruction of blood flow in the hypophyseal portal system and contributes to this defective state. In Erdheim–Chester disease, cells of the immune system called histiocytes proliferate at an abnormal rate causing a plethora of symptoms and, in more severe cases, death. The disruption of the hypophyseal portal system has been implicated as the mechanism for several symptoms involving the central nervous symptom, most notably diabetes insipidus.

== See also ==
- Hypopituitarism
