= Thyrotropin-releasing hormone =

Hormone

TRH

Identifiers
- Aliases: TRH, Pro-TRF, thyrotropin releasing hormone
- External IDs: OMIM: 613879; MGI: 98823; GeneCards: TRH

Gene location (Mouse)
Chr.	Chromosome 6 (mouse)
Band	6 D1|6 41.03 cM	Start	92,219,042 bp
Band	6 D1|6 41.03 cM	End	92,221,631 bp
Gene ontology
Molecular function	hormone activity; thyrotropin-releasing hormone activity
Cellular component	cytoplasm; secretory granule; extracellular region; nucleus; plasma membrane
Biological process	response to hypoxia; response to organic cyclic compound; response to corticosterone; cell-cell signaling; response to glucose; negative regulation of feeding behavior; hormone-mediated signaling pathway; response to cold; response to ethanol; signal transduction; adult walking behavior; positive regulation of insulin secretion; positive regulation of gamma-aminobutyric acid secretion; negative regulation of glutamate secretion; histamine metabolic process; eating behavior; regulation of signaling receptor activity; G protein-coupled receptor signaling pathway
Sources:Amigo / QuickGO
Orthologs
Databases	NCBI: entry; OMA: entry
Species	Human	Mouse
Entrez	7200	22044
Ensembl	ENSG00000170893	ENSMUSG00000005892
UniProt	P20396	Q62361
RefSeq (mRNA)	NM_007117	NM_009426
RefSeq (protein)	NP_009048	NP_033452
Location (UCSC)	n/a	Chr 6: 92.22 – 92.22 Mb
PubMed search
- Wikidata
View/Edit Human	View/Edit Mouse

Thyrotropin-releasing hormone
Clinical data
- ATC code: V04CJ02 (WHO)

Identifiers
- CAS Number: 24305-27-9
- PubChem CID: 638678
- IUPHAR/BPS: 2139
- DrugBank: DB09421
- ChemSpider: 554166
- UNII: 5Y5F15120W
- KEGG: C03958
- ChEBI: CHEBI:35940
- ChEMBL: ChEMBL1472
- CompTox Dashboard (EPA): DTXSID0023533
- ECHA InfoCard: 100.041.934

Chemical and physical data
- Formula: C_{16}H_{22}N_{6}O_{4}
- Molar mass: 362.390 g·mol^{−1}
- 3D model (JSmol): Interactive image
- SMILES: C1C[C@H](N(C1)C(=O)[C@H](CC2=CN=CN2)NC(=O)[C@@H]3CCC(=O)N3)C(=O)N
- InChI: InChI=1S/C16H22N6O4/c17-14(24)12-2-1-5-22(12)16(26)11(6-9-7-18-8-19-9)21-15(25)10-3-4-13(23)20-10/h7-8,10-12H,1-6H2,(H2,17,24)(H,18,19)(H,20,23)(H,21,25)/t10-,11-,12-/m0/s1; Key:XNSAINXGIQZQOO-SRVKXCTJSA-N

Thyrotropin-releasing hormone (TRH) is a hypophysiotropic hormone produced by neurons in the hypothalamus that stimulates the release of thyroid-stimulating hormone (TSH) as well as prolactin from the anterior pituitary.

TRH has been used clinically in diagnosis of hyperthyroidism, and for the treatment of spinocerebellar degeneration and disturbance of consciousness in humans. Its pharmaceutical form is called protirelin (INN) (/proʊˈtaɪrɪlɪn/).

== Physiology ==
=== Synthesis and release ===
The hypothalamic-pituitary-thyroid axis. TRH can be seen in green.

TRH is synthesized within parvocellular neurons of the paraventricular nucleus of the hypothalamus. It is translated as a 242-amino acid precursor polypeptide that contains 6 copies of the sequence -Gln-His-Pro-Gly-, with both ends of the sequence flanked by Lys-Arg or Arg-Arg sequences.

To produce the mature form, a series of enzymes are required. First, a protease cleaves to the C-terminal side of the flanking Lys-Arg or Arg-Arg. Second, a carboxypeptidase removes the Lys/Arg residues leaving Gly as the C-terminal residue. Then, this Gly is converted into an amide residue by a series of enzymes collectively known as peptidylglycine-alpha-amidating monooxygenase. Concurrently with these processing steps, the N-terminal Gln (glutamine) is converted into pyroglutamate (a cyclic residue). These multiple steps produce 6 copies of the mature TRH molecule per precursor molecule for human TRH (5 for mouse TRH).

TRH synthesizing neurons of the paraventricular nucleus project to the medial portion of the external layer of the median eminence. Following secretion at the median eminence, TRH travels to the anterior pituitary via the hypophyseal portal system where it binds to the TRH receptor stimulating the release of thyroid-stimulating hormone from thyrotropes and prolactin from lactotropes. The half-life of TRH in the blood is approximately 6 minutes.

TRH is also produced in many hypothalamic neurons not associated with the pituitary, as well as multiple other CNS regions (including the spinal cord, brainstem, thalamus, amygdala, and hippocampus), indicating various non-neuroendocrine functions.

TRH is additionally produced in multiple endocrine and non-endocrine tissues outside the CNS, including the anterior pituitary, parafollicular cells of the thyroid glands, medulla of the adrenal gland, islet cells of the pancreas, Leydig cells of the testis, epididymis, prostate, GI tract, spleen, lung, ovary, retina, and hair follicles.

==== Regulation of release ====
Regulation of TRH release is regulated principally by a negative feedback loop by thyroid hormone, and a neuronal open loop by hypothalamic factors. TRH release is additionally regulated by other circulating hormones (including glucocorticoids, and oestrogens), and inhibited by cytokines. The tanycytes of the median eminence also exert a regulatory effect on TRH release.

=== Function and effects ===
==== Neurotransmission and neuromodulation ====
Extensive production of TRH throughout the CNS various non-endocrine (neurotransmissive and neuromodulatory) functions. Indeed, artificial administration into the CNS exhibits autonomic (hyperthermic, hypertensive, positive chronotropic, and gastrokinetic effects, and promotion of insulin and gastric acid release), antiepileptic, anxiolytic, and pro-locomotive effect.

== Structure ==
Skeletal formula of TRH

TRH is a tripeptide, with an amino acid sequence of pyroglutamyl-histidyl-proline amide.

== History ==
The structure of TRH was first determined, and the hormone synthesized, by Roger Guillemin and Andrew V. Schally in 1969. Both parties insisted their labs determined the sequence first: Schally first suggested the possibility in 1966, but abandoned it after Guillemin proposed TRH was not actually a peptide. Guillemin's chemist began concurring with these results in 1969, as NIH threatened to cut off funding for the project, leading both parties to return to work on synthesis.

Schally and Guillemin shared the 1977 Nobel Prize in Medicine "for their discoveries concerning the peptide hormone production of the brain." News accounts of their work often focused on their "fierce competition" and use of a very large number of sheep and pig brains to locate the hormone.

== Clinical significance ==
=== Diagnostic ===
Intravenous injection of TRH has been used for diagnostic purposes in the context of the TRH test; administration of exogenous TRH can be used to determine whether hypothyroidism is of hypothalamic or hypophyseal etiology. However, this diagnostic approach has been superseded by ultrasensitive TSH assays and is nowadays only seldom employed.

==== ACTH and GH release ====
TRH promotes release growth hormone (GH) in individuals with certain pathological conditions, and of adrenocorticotropic hormone (ACTH) in some individuals with Cushing's disease.

TRH promotes GH release in individuals with acromegaly; prolonged exposure to GHRH may cause the pituitary to release GH in response to TRH. TRH may also promote GH release in individuals with hepatic disease, uremia, childhood hypothyroidism, anorexia nervosa, and depression. Conversely, TRH suppresses GH release during sleep.

=== Side effects ===
Side effects after intravenous TRH administration are minimal. Nausea, flushing, urinary urgency, and mild rise in blood pressure have been reported. After intrathecal administration, shaking, sweating, shivering, restlessness, and mild rise in blood pressure were observed.

=== Research ===
TRH has been evaluated for the treatment of various neurological disorders. It has been attempted for treatment of various epileptic disorders. TRH has been shown to improve outcomes of CNS injuries in experimental models. Efficacy for the treatment ALS and spinal muscle atrophy has not been demonstrated.

Many individuals with depression exhibit a blunted endocrine response to TRH due to unknown reasons, and the response is correlated with clinical outcomes. Involvement of TRH in the pathogenesis of depression has nevertheless not been well established. TRH has undergone research for its ostensible antidepressant properties, however, results regarding efficacy have been inconsistent. One study on a small sample of people with treatment-resistant depression found short-lived anti-depressant and anti-suicidal effects when TRH was administered intrathecally. An orally bioavailable prodrug is being researched. In 2012, the U.S. Army awarded a research grant to develop a TRH nasal spray for suicide prevention amongst veterans.

TRH acts as a wakefulness-promoting agent, causing awakening from sleep or sedation.

TRH has been shown to exert anti-aging effect in a mice model.

Thyrotropin-releasing hormone (TRH)

Identifiers
- Symbol: TRH
- Pfam: PF05438
- InterPro: IPR008857
Available protein structures:
- PDB: IPR008857 PF05438 (ECOD; PDBsum)
- AlphaFold: IPR008857; PF05438

== See also ==
- Thyrotropin-releasing hormone receptor
- Thyroid-stimulating hormone
- Hypothalamic–pituitary–thyroid axis
- Hypothalamic–pituitary–prolactin axis
