= Emicerfont =

Chemical compound

Clinical data
- Routes of administration: Oral
- ATC code: None

Identifiers
- IUPAC name: 1-[1-[1-(4-methoxy-2-methylphenyl)-6-methyl-2,3-dihydropyrrolo[2,3-b]pyridin-4-yl]pyrazol-3-yl]imidazolidin-2-one
- CAS Number: 786701-13-1
- PubChem CID: 11223423
- ChemSpider: 9398476
- UNII: OJ8EG4264P
- KEGG: D09610
- CompTox Dashboard (EPA): DTXSID20229231

Chemical and physical data
- Formula: C_{22}H_{24}N_{6}O_{2}
- Molar mass: 404.474 g·mol^{−1}
- 3D model (JSmol): Interactive image
- SMILES: CC1=C(C=CC(=C1)OC)N2CCC3=C2N=C(C=C3N4C=CC(=N4)N5CCNC5=O)C

Emicerfont (GW-876,008) is a drug developed by GlaxoSmithKline which acts as a CRF-1 antagonist. Corticotropin releasing factor (CRF), also known as Corticotropin releasing hormone, is an endogenous peptide hormone which is released in response to various triggers such as chronic stress, and activates the two corticotropin-releasing hormone receptors: CRF_{1} and CRF_{2}. This then triggers the release of corticotropin (ACTH), another hormone which is involved in the physiological response to stress.

Emicerfont blocks the CRF_{1} receptor, and so reduces ACTH release. It has been investigated for the treatment of irritable bowel syndrome (IBS) and alcoholism, and while it was not effective enough to be adopted for medical use in these applications, it continues to be used for research, as the role of the CRH-ACTH system in IBS remains poorly understood.

== See also ==
- Corticotropin releasing hormone antagonists
  - Antalarmin
  - Pexacerfont
  - Verucerfont
