= Sauvagine =

Neuropeptide

Identifiers
- Organism: Phyllomedusa sauvagei
- Symbol: N/A
- CAS number: 74434-59-6
- UniProt: P01144
Search for
- Structures: Swiss-model
- Domains: InterPro

Sauvagine is a neuropeptide from the corticotropin-releasing factor (CRF) family of peptides and is orthologous to the mammalian hormone, urocortin 1, and the teleost fish hormone, urotensin 1. It is 40 amino acids in length, and has the sequence XGPPISIDLSLELLRKMIEIEKQEKEKQQAANNRLLLDTI-NH2, with a pyrrolidone carboxylic acid modification at the N-terminal and amidation of the C-terminal isoleucine residue. It was originally isolated from the skin of the frog Phyllomedusa sauvagii. Given its relation to other CRF-related peptides, it exerts similar physiological effects as corticotropin-releasing hormone.

Sauvagine belongs to the corticotropin-releasing factor (CRF) family that also includes CRF, urocortin l/urotensin l, urocortin II and urocortin III.

== Interactions ==
Sauvagine has been shown to interact with corticotropin releasing factor receptors 1 and 2, and (as with other CRF-related peptides) is also bound by the corticotropin-releasing factor binding protein.
