= Corticotropin-releasing hormone binding protein family =

Corticotropin-releasing hormone binding protein (CRH-BP)

Identifiers
- Symbol: CRH-BP
- Pfam: PF05428
- InterPro: IPR008435
Available protein structures:
- PDB: IPR008435 PF05428 (ECOD; PDBsum)
- AlphaFold: IPR008435; PF05428

Corticotropin-releasing hormone binding protein (CRH-BP) binds corticotropin-releasing hormone (CRH) and several related peptide hormones (urocortin 1, urotensin 1, and sauvagine). It is an ancient, highly conserved protein whose origin predates the divergence of protostomes and deuterostomes.

Corticotropin-releasing hormone (CRH) plays multiple roles in vertebrate species. It is the major hypothalamic releasing factor for pituitary adrenocorticotropin secretion, and is a neurotransmitter or neuromodulator at other sites in the central nervous system. In non-mammalian vertebrates, CRH not only acts as a neurotransmitter and hypophysiotropin, it also acts as a potent thyrotropin-releasing factor, allowing CRH to regulate both the adrenal and thyroid axes, especially in development.

Corticotropin-releasing factor binding protein (CRH-BP) is thought to play an inhibitory role in which it binds CRH and other CRH-like ligands and prevents the activation of CRH receptors 1 and 2. There is however evidence that CRH-BP may also exhibit diverse extra and intracellular roles in a cell specific fashion and at specific times in development.

== Human proteins ==
CRHBP;
