= UCN =

UCN may stand for:

- National Civic Union (Bolivia), a political party
- Ultracold neutrons
- Genes in the human urocortin family
  - UCN (gene)
  - UCN2
  - UCN3
- UCN, the IATA Airport Code for Buchanan Airport
- Ultimate Custom Night, the seventh game in the Five Nights at Freddy's game series
- Universal character name, a feature of C99 (and later versions).

== Education ==
- Central University of Nicaragua, a private and nonprofit university, Nicaragua
- Universidad Católica del Norte, a university in Antofagasta, Chile
- University College of the North, a university college in Manitoba, Canada
- University College of Northern Denmark, a university in Denmark
