= HM17321 =

Experimental drug

HM17321 is an experimental drug that acts as a corticotropin-releasing hormone receptor 2 (CRFR2) selective urocortin-2 (UCN2) analog developed by Hanmi Pharmaceutical.
