= UCN3 =

Protein-coding gene in humans

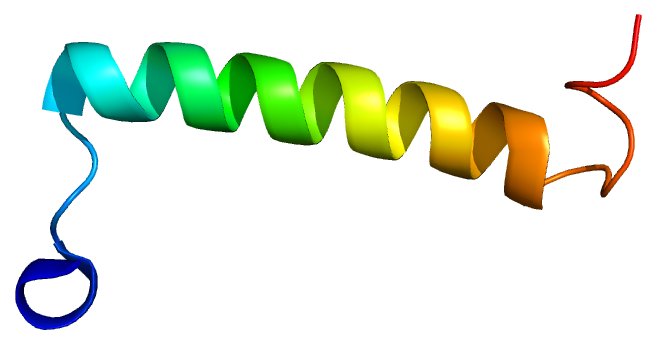

Identifiers
- Aliases: UCN3, SCP, SPC, UCNIII, urocortin 3
- External IDs: OMIM: 605901; MGI: 1932970; GeneCards: UCN3
Available structures
PDB	Ortholog search: PDBe RCSB
PDB	List of PDB id codes 2RMH, 3N93

Gene location (Human)
Chr.	Chromosome 10 (human)
Band	10p15.1	Start	5,364,966 bp
Band	10p15.1	End	5,374,692 bp

Gene location (Mouse)
Chr.	Chromosome 13 (mouse)
Band	13|13 A1	Start	3,990,688 bp
Band	13|13 A1	End	3,995,349 bp
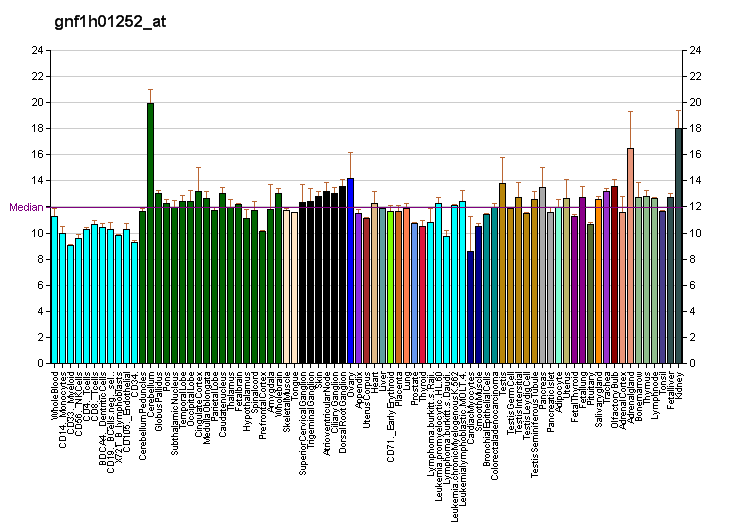
RNA expression pattern
Bgee	Human / Mouse (ortholog); Top expressed in: islet of Langerhans; olfactory zone of nasal mucosa; mucosa of transverse colon; rectum; body of pancreas; anterior pituitary; gallbladder; duodenum; sigmoid colon; muscle layer of sigmoid colon / Top expressed in: islet of Langerhans; duodenum; nucleus of stria terminalis; jejunum; colon; primary visual cortex; More reference expression data
BioGPS	More reference expression data
Gene ontology
Molecular function	G protein-coupled receptor binding; corticotropin-releasing hormone receptor 2 binding; hormone activity; corticotropin-releasing hormone receptor binding
Cellular component	neuron projection; varicosity; axon terminus; axon; extracellular region; extracellular space; intracellular anatomical structure
Biological process	digestion; response to stress; cellular response to nutrient levels; positive regulation of insulin secretion; response to immobilization stress; response to glucose; response to starvation; cellular response to hypoxia; positive regulation of membrane potential; response to corticosterone; regulation of signaling receptor activity; adenylate cyclase-activating G protein-coupled receptor signaling pathway; hormone-mediated signaling pathway
Sources:Amigo / QuickGO
Orthologs
Databases	NCBI: entry; OMA: entry
Species	Human	Mouse
Entrez	114131	83428
Ensembl	ENSG00000178473	ENSMUSG00000044988
UniProt	Q969E3	Q924A4
RefSeq (mRNA)	NM_053049	NM_031250
RefSeq (protein)	NP_444277	NP_112540
Location (UCSC)	Chr 10: 5.36 – 5.37 Mb	Chr 13: 3.99 – 4 Mb
PubMed search
- Wikidata
View/Edit Human	View/Edit Mouse

Urocortin-3 is a protein that, in humans, is encoded by the UCN3 gene. It belongs to the corticotropin-releasing hormone family.

== Function ==
This gene is a member of the sauvagine/corticotropin-releasing factor/urotensin I family. It is structurally related to the corticotropin-releasing factor (CRF) gene and the encoded product is an endogenous ligand for CRF type 2 receptors.

In the brain it may be responsible for the effects of stress on appetite. In humans, it is also expressed by alpha cells and beta cells in the pancreas and is co-released with glucagon and insulin to promote somatostatin release from neighboring delta cells, which provides negative feedback on glucagon and insulin secretion. In spite of the gene family name similarity, the product of this gene has no sequence similarity to Urotensin-II.
