= Urotensin-II receptor =

Protein-coding gene in the species Homo sapiens

UTS2R

Identifiers
- Aliases: UTS2R, GPR14, UR-2-R, UTR, UTR2, urotensin 2 receptor
- External IDs: OMIM: 600896; MGI: 2183450; GeneCards: UTS2R

Gene location (Human)
Chr.	Chromosome 17 (human)
Band	17q25.3	Start	82,371,765 bp
Band	17q25.3	End	82,377,458 bp

Gene location (Mouse)
Chr.	Chromosome 11 (mouse)
Band	11|11 E2	Start	121,051,097 bp
Band	11|11 E2	End	121,052,799 bp
RNA expression pattern
Bgee	Human / Mouse (ortholog); Top expressed in: right testis; apex of heart; left testis; right auricle of heart; thigh; left lobe of thyroid gland; muscle of thigh; left ventricle; right lobe of thyroid gland; right frontal lobe / Top expressed in: blastocyst; ankle; zygote; morula; secondary oocyte; embryo; embryo; primary oocyte; muscle of thigh; knee joint; More reference expression data
BioGPS	n/a
Gene ontology
Molecular function	G protein-coupled receptor activity; signal transducer activity; urotensin II receptor activity; G protein-coupled peptide receptor activity
Cellular component	integral component of membrane; recycling endosome; membrane; plasma membrane; integral component of plasma membrane; early endosome
Biological process	negative regulation of urine volume; negative regulation of blood pressure; positive regulation of fibroblast proliferation; positive regulation of cytosolic calcium ion concentration; blood circulation; positive regulation of angiogenesis; regulation of blood pressure; phospholipase C-activating G protein-coupled receptor signaling pathway; positive regulation of blood pressure; positive regulation of cell growth; positive regulation of vasoconstriction; positive regulation of circadian sleep/wake cycle, wakefulness; positive regulation of circadian sleep/wake cycle, REM sleep; negative regulation of renal sodium excretion; neuropeptide signaling pathway; negative regulation of glomerular filtration; signal transduction; blood vessel diameter maintenance; G protein-coupled receptor signaling pathway
Sources:Amigo / QuickGO
Orthologs
Databases	NCBI: entry; OMA: entry
Species	Human	Mouse
Entrez	2837	217369
Ensembl	ENSG00000181408	ENSMUSG00000039321
UniProt	Q9UKP6	Q8VIH9
RefSeq (mRNA)	NM_018949; NM_001381897	NM_145440
RefSeq (protein)	NP_061822; NP_001368826	NP_663415
Location (UCSC)	Chr 17: 82.37 – 82.38 Mb	Chr 11: 121.05 – 121.05 Mb
PubMed search
- Wikidata
View/Edit Human	View/Edit Mouse

The urotensin-2 receptor (UR-II-R) also known as GPR14 is a class A rhodopsin family G protein coupled-receptor (GPCR) that is 386 amino acids long which binds primarily to the neuropeptide urotensin II.^{[1]} The receptor quickly rose to prominence when it was found that when activated by urotensin II it induced the most potent vasoconstriction effect ever seen. While the precise function of the urotensin II receptor is not fully known it has been linked to cardiovascular effects, stress, and REM sleep.

== Ligands ==
There are two known endogenous agonists for the urotensin II receptor. One is urotensin II whose mRNA is found in a variety of tissues including the brain and also blood vessels. It is a potent vasoconstrictor and can increase REM cycles. The other is urotensin II-Related Peptide (URP) which is found in a variety of tissues as well although at less concentrations then urotensin II. The one exception is in human reproductive tissue where the levels of URP are much higher than urotensin II.

== Cellular Pathway ==
Activation protein kinase C

Urotensin II Receptor interacts with the G Protein whose alpha subunit is Gαq11 which is mainly involved in activating Protein Kinase C (PKC). This then activates phospholipase C which increases the intercellular amount of calcium through the activation of IP3 which is an intracellular molecule that acts as secondary messenger. IP3 will then release calcium which then activates PKC.

When the urotensin II receptor is activated it also promotes beta arrestin translocation. Beta arrestin is important for ceasing the response of a receptor to a stimuli. Beta arrestin also brings with it other proteins that internalize the receptor which also helps in desensitizing the cell to the stimuli.

== Tissue distribution ==
Based on RT-PCR techniques the urotensin II receptor appears to be expressed throughout the entire brain. On the other hand, when using in situ hybridization technique which is less sensitive but provides more information of the anatomical location urotensin II receptor mRNA was shown to be restricted to the brainstem cholinergic neurons of the laterodorsal tegmental (LDT) and the pedunculopontine tegmental nuclei (PPT) both of which are important for REM sleep. These two different results are because urotensin II receptor can also be found in blood vessels which is what the sensitive RT-PCR technique was likely detecting. Urotensin II receptors are also found in the cholinergic neurons of the spinal cord indicating some type of motor function.

Urotensin II receptors have also been found in other peripheral tissues and blood vessels. This suggests some effects on the cardiovascular system.

== Function ==
=== CNS ===
When the urotensin II receptor is activated through an intracerebroventricular (icv) injection of urotensin II it causes an increase of corticotropin releasing factor through the activation of the hypothalamic paraventricular neurons (PVN) which lead to increased plasma levels of adrenocorticotropic hormones. C-fos levels which go up whenever there is an increase in neural activity were detected in the brain 20 minutes after the urotensin II was injected. The stimulation of the PVN by the activation of urotensin II receptor means that it directly affects the hypothalamus pituitary axis (HPA) which is important in the regulation of many important body functions. Rats also exhibit many stress related behaviors when injected with urotensin II such as pacing and fidgeting in familiar environments.

REM sleep is controlled by the cholinergic neurons in the PPT and LDT. Local injection of urotensin II into the PPT to leads to increased REM sleep episodes where the firing of the cholinergic neurons was observed through electrophysiological studies. The studies also showed there was no effect on the non-cholinergic neurons. Wakefulness and slow wave sleep were not affected by the activation of the urotensin II receptor.

=== Cardiovascular ===
Short term effects of the activation of the urotensin II receptor is the burst intercellular calcium in the aorta which causes vasoconstriction of the vessel. There is also evidence that there are long term effects of the activation of the urotensin II receptor which could play a role in cardiomyocytic hypertrophy.

== Gene ==
Human urotensin II receptor is located on chromosome 17q25 as an intronless gene. There are no known subtypes of the receptor but the possibility cannot be discounted. It has similar domain sequences to the somatostatin receptor, and in lab conditions can be activated by somatostatin.

== Clinical significance ==
=== Mutations ===
There is one single-nucleotide polymorphism that is known to occur in humans regarding the urotensin II receptor. R148^{3.50} is instead H148^{3.50} which effects how the cell responds when the urotensin II receptor is activated. The receptor cannot activate the PKC but it can still activate the ERK1/2 pathway although it is a little bit slower.

There have been studies done on specific amino acids on the urotensin II receptor especially the ones that are homologous to the other members of the rhodopsin family. These include, D97^{2.50}, E147^{3.49}, and Y149^{3.50}. In all cases the amino acids were converted to alanine and their effects were observed. The mutated D97^{2.50} receptor could not activate PKC nor could it activate the ERK1/2 pathway. This meant that it affected the activation of both pathways and plays a critical role. The other two amino acids which were mutated E147^{3.49} and Y149^{3.50} still activated both PKC and ERK1/2 suggesting that they did not play a critical role in the activation of the pathway.
