= Verucerfont =

Chemical compound

Clinical data
- Routes of administration: Oral
- ATC code: none

Identifiers
- IUPAC name: 3-(4-methoxy-2-methylphenyl)-2,5-dimethyl-N-[(1S)-1-(3-methyl-1,2,4-oxadiazol-5-yl)propyl]pyrazolo[1,5-a]pyrimidin-7-amine
- CAS Number: 885220-61-1
- PubChem CID: 11596613
- ChemSpider: 28295024
- UNII: X60608B091
- KEGG: D09695
- CompTox Dashboard (EPA): DTXSID501032013
- ECHA InfoCard: 100.158.110

Chemical and physical data
- Formula: C_{22}H_{26}N_{6}O_{2}
- Molar mass: 406.490 g·mol^{−1}
- 3D model (JSmol): Interactive image
- SMILES: CC[C@@H](c1nc(no1)C)Nc2cc(nc3n2nc(c3c4ccc(cc4C)OC)C)C
- InChI: InChI=1S/C22H26N6O2/c1-7-17(22-24-15(5)27-30-22)25-19-11-12(2)23-21-20(14(4)26-28(19)21)16-9-8-10-18(29-6)13(16)3/h8-11,17,25H,7H2,1-6H3/t17-/m0/s1; Key:NZQAFTPOKINLRY-KRWDZBQOSA-N

Verucerfont (GSK-561,679) is a drug developed by GlaxoSmithKline which acts as a CRF-1 antagonist. Corticotropin releasing factor (CRF), also known as Corticotropin releasing hormone, is an endogenous peptide hormone which is released in response to various triggers such as chronic stress, and activates the two corticotropin-releasing hormone receptors CRH-1 and CRH-2. This then triggers the release of corticotropin (ACTH), another hormone which is involved in the physiological response to stress.

Verucerfont blocks the CRH-1 receptor, and so reduces ACTH release following chronic stress. It is under investigation as a potential treatment for alcoholism, as chronic stress is often a factor in both development of alcoholism and relapse in recovering alcoholics. It has shown promising results in animal studies. However, human trials have shown that while the neuroendocrine effects translate from animal models, the alcohol anti-craving effects do not.

== See also ==
- Antalarmin
- Corticotropin releasing hormone antagonists
- List of investigational anxiolytics
- Pexacerfont
