= Urocortin III =

Amino acid peptide

Urocortin III, a 38–41 amino acid peptide, is a member of the CRF (corticotropin-releasing factor), also known as CRH (corticotropin-releasing hormone) family of peptides, with a long evolutionary lineage.

Separate chromosomes harbouring two exons each are home to the genes encoding UCN, UCN2, and UCN3. A gene on human chromosome 10p15 at location 5.40 Mb encodes the urocortin, UCN III, which has been discovered more recently. A 161 amino acid precursor is produced when the UCN III gene is translated. Mature UCN III with 38 or 41 amino acids would be produced by proteolytic cleavage between arginine- or threonine-lysine residues. Human plasma contains both the 38 and 41 amino acid forms of UCN III, although the 38 amino acid form is more prevalent, according to findings from high-performance liquid chromatography.

Each urocortin peptide has a distinct expression location and function, yet they all share conserved structural similarity. Urocortins' structures, as determined by nuclear magnetic resonance, exhibit alpha-helical secondary structures, which support biological activity and binding selectivity.

== Evolutionary view ==
Multiple urocortin genes are present in vertebrate lineages as a result of the two waves of vertebrate whole-genome duplication. Two ligands, the CRF/UCN1 and UCN2/UCN3 paralogs, and two receptors, CRFR1 and CRFR2, were produced by a first genome duplication in early vertebrates. The CRF system observed in modern vertebrates, which has four ligands and two receptors, was then created by a second genome duplication that split the gene between UCN2 and UCN3 and between CRF and UCN1. Two peptide genes were hypothesized to have been present in a vertebrate progenitor that gave rise to the different lineages that contained urocortin (UCN I), CRH1, and CRH2 in one group and urocortin II (UCN II) and urocortin III (UCN III ) in the other.

In many vertebrates, there are five members of the corticotropin-releasing hormone and urocortin family of peptides: CRH (crha/crhb in teleosts), CRH2, UCN/UTS1, UCN II, and UCN III. The two receptors, CRFR1 and CRFR2, and the four ligands, CRF, Urocortin1 (UCN1), UCN2, and UCN3, make up the mammalian CRF system. Genes for mentioned proteins can perform a multitude of tasks in a wide range of animals due to differences in their expression patterns and receptor affinities.

== Urocortin affinity to receptors ==
Compared to UCN II or UCN III, UCN I has a greater binding affinity for the CRHR1 receptor. Urocortin III is extremely selective for the CRF2 receptor, in contrast to Urocortin I and comparable to Urocortin II. Of the two closely related CRF receptors (CRFR1 and CRFR2) that are members of the class B family of G protein-coupled receptors, each peptide activates at least one of them. CRFR2 can be effectively activated by UCN II and UCN III. By attaching itself to CRHR2 with a strong affinity, this peptide (UCNIII) helps regulate a number of bodily processes. All things considered, UCNs have approximately ten times more affinity for CRHR2 than CRH.

== Distribution ==
UCN III is widely distributed throughout the brain and is present in many bodily tissues—including the skin, gastrointestinal tract (GI tract), pancreatic beta cells, kidneys, heart, endocrine system, and brain. The medial amygdala (MeA), rostral perifornical area of the hypothalamus, bed nucleus of the stria terminalis (BNST), superior paraolivary nucleus, nucleus parabrachialis, and premammillary nucleus are the primary locations where UCN III is expressed.

Expression of UCN III occurs late in the differentiation process of beta cells, where it is necessary for complete insulin secretion triggered by glucose and incretin, and is shown in mature beta cells in both mice and humans. Beta cells use the ATP-sensitive potassium channel (KATP channel) to facilitate the glucose-dependent release of UCN III. This is corroborated by the expression of PC1/3, Nkx6.1, and Pdx1 in hESC-derived UCN III ^{+} beta cells. But human UCN III is not specific to the beta cell lineage; rather, it is a generic marker for both the alpha and beta cell lineages, as seen by its expression in primary and hESC-derived alpha cells. A universal marker of alpha and beta cell development in humans is Ucn III.

After triggering the receptors in the cerebral endothelial cells, UCN III crosses the blood–brain barrier, as demonstrated by a transneuronal tracer injection into the ventral pre-mammillary nucleus of the rat brain. Further research using tracer molecule injections to examine the function of UCN III reveals that UCN III is located rostral to the hypothalamus and projects to the ventromedial hypothalamus. It is well recognized that this brain region controls energy balance and hunger. In the same brain regions, UCN III and CRHR2 are expressed, and different physiological and behavioural processes result from their activation.

== Stress ==
One important neuropeptide that modulates various aspects of behavior and brain function is UCN III. In the brain, UCN III mRNA was specifically detected in the perifornical region, the medial nucleus of the amygdala, and the median preoptic nucleus.

The endocrine, autonomic, and behavioral reactions to stress are all regulated by the corticotropin-releasing factor (CRF) system, which is widely recognized for this function. When stress levels are elevated, UCN III expression increases. UCN III is mostly expressed in areas linked to stress-related behaviours.

The origin of projection to the midbrain's median amygdala region is the ventral pre-mammillary nucleus, which exhibited high UCN III positivity. The confirmation of UCN III 's essential role in numerous brain activities linked to anxiety, such as aggression and sexual behaviours, comes from its engagement in this circuit. Mammalian stress reactions are known to be modulated by urocortins. It alters mammals' reactions to stress and functions in the stress recovery mechanism. UCN III and its receptor's function in clinical disorders linked to stress,

Stress homeostasis is known to be mediated via a regulatory axis that includes the neuropeptide urocortin III (UCN III ) and the corticotropin-releasing hormone receptor 2 (CRHR2). Cardiovascular disease, sleep apnea, post-traumatic stress disorder, and other stress-related health issues are thought to be associated with dysregulation of this peptide/receptor axis. To develop a workable clinical laboratory diagnostic, it is crucial to comprehend the physiology and measurement of the UCN III /CRHR2 axis.
