= Urotensin-II =

UTS2

Identifiers
- Aliases: UTS2, PRO1068, U-II, UCN2, UII, urotensin 2
- External IDs: OMIM: 604097; MGI: 1346329; GeneCards: UTS2

Gene location (Human)
Chr.	Chromosome 1 (human)
Band	1p36.23	Start	7,843,083 bp
Band	1p36.23	End	7,853,512 bp

Gene location (Mouse)
Chr.	Chromosome 4 (mouse)
Band	4|4 E2	Start	151,081,554 bp
Band	4|4 E2	End	151,086,267 bp
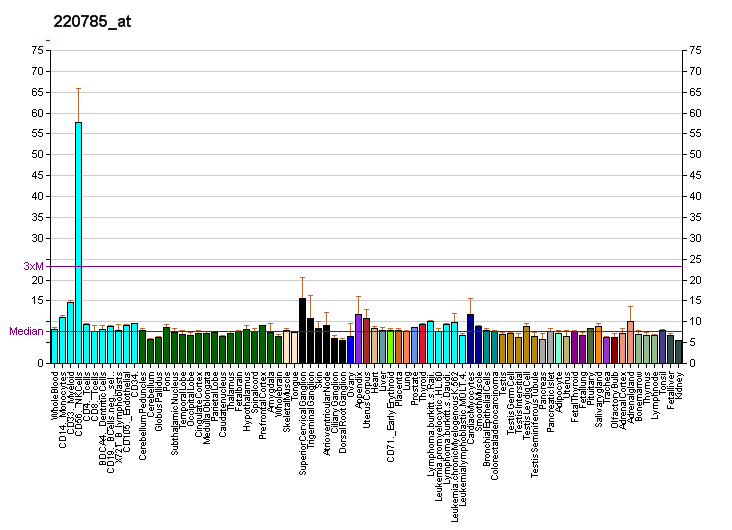

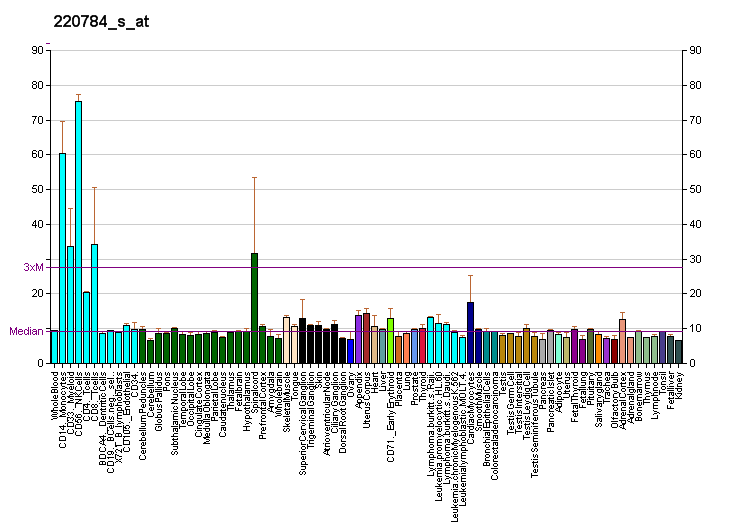
RNA expression pattern
Bgee	Human / Mouse (ortholog); Top expressed in: testicle; gonad; right adrenal cortex; granulocyte; lymph node; left adrenal cortex; rectum; epithelium of colon; mononuclear cell; mucosa of transverse colon / Top expressed in: lumbar subsegment of spinal cord; facial motor nucleus; anterior horn of spinal cord; motor neuron; neural layer of retina; cerebellar cortex; spermatid; neural tube; skeletal muscle tissue; lip; More reference expression data
BioGPS	More reference expression data
Gene ontology
Molecular function	hormone activity; signaling receptor binding
Cellular component	extracellular region; extracellular space
Biological process	muscle contraction; regulation of blood pressure; chemical synaptic transmission; blood vessel diameter maintenance; regulation of signaling receptor activity; G protein-coupled receptor signaling pathway
Sources:Amigo / QuickGO
Orthologs
Databases	NCBI: entry; OMA: entry
Species	Human	Mouse
Entrez	10911	24111
Ensembl	ENSG00000049247	ENSMUSG00000028963
UniProt	O95399	Q9QZQ3
RefSeq (mRNA)	NM_006786; NM_021995	NM_011910
RefSeq (protein)	NP_006777; NP_068835	NP_036040
Location (UCSC)	Chr 1: 7.84 – 7.85 Mb	Chr 4: 151.08 – 151.09 Mb
PubMed search
- Wikidata
View/Edit Human	View/Edit Mouse

Urotensin-II

Names
- IUPAC name L-α-glutamyl-L-threonyl-L-prolyl-L-α-aspartyl-L-cysteinyl-L-phenylalanyl-L-tryptophyl-L-lysyl-L-tyrosyl-L-cysteinyl-L-valine (5→10)-disulfide

Identifiers
CAS Number	251293-28-4
3D model (JSmol)	Interactive image
ChEMBL	ChEMBL437430
ChemSpider	24646295
PubChem CID	146158369
- InChI: InChI=1S/C64H85N13O18S2/c1-33(2)52(64(94)95)75-61(91)48-32-97-96-31-47(73-59(89)46(29-51(82)83)72-62(92)49-17-11-25-77(49)63(93)53(34(3)78)76-54(84)40(66)22-23-50(80)81)60(90)70-43(26-35-12-5-4-6-13-35)56(86)71-45(28-37-30-67-41-15-8-7-14-39(37)41)58(88)68-42(16-9-10-24-65)55(85)69-44(57(87)74-48)27-36-18-20-38(79)21-19-36/h4-8,12-15,18-21,30,33-34,40,42-49,52-53,67,78-79H,9-11,16-17,22-29,31-32,65-66H2,1-3H3,(H,68,88)(H,69,85)(H,70,90)(H,71,86)(H,72,92)(H,73,89)(H,74,87)(H,75,91)(H,76,84)(H,80,81)(H,82,83)(H,94,95)/t34-,40+,42+,43+,44+,45+,46+,47+,48+,49+,52+,53+/m1/s1 Key: HFNHAPQMXICKCF-USJMABIRSA-N; InChI=1/C64H85N13O18S2/c1-33(2)52(64(94)95)75-61(91)48-32-97-96-31-47(73-59(89)46(29-51(82)83)72-62(92)49-17-11-25-77(49)63(93)53(34(3)78)76-54(84)40(66)22-23-50(80)81)60(90)70-43(26-35-12-5-4-6-13-35)56(86)71-45(28-37-30-67-41-15-8-7-14-39(37)41)58(88)68-42(16-9-10-24-65)55(85)69-44(57(87)74-48)27-36-18-20-38(79)21-19-36/h4-8,12-15,18-21,30,33-34,40,42-49,52-53,67,78-79H,9-11,16-17,22-29,31-32,65-66H2,1-3H3,(H,68,88)(H,69,85)(H,70,90)(H,71,86)(H,72,92)(H,73,89)(H,74,87)(H,75,91)(H,76,84)(H,80,81)(H,82,83)(H,94,95)/t34-,40+,42+,43+,44+,45+,46+,47+,48+,49+,52+,53+/m1/s1 Key: HFNHAPQMXICKCF-USJMABIRBM
- SMILES: C[C@H]([C@@H](C(=O)N1CCC[C@H]1C(=O)N[C@@H](CC(=O)O)C(=O)N[C@H]2CSSC[C@H](NC(=O)[C@@H](NC(=O)[C@@H](NC(=O)[C@@H](NC(=O)[C@@H](NC2=O)Cc3ccccc3)Cc4c[nH]c5c4cccc5)CCCCN)Cc6ccc(cc6)O)C(=O)N[C@@H](C(C)C)C(=O)O)NC(=O)[C@H](CCC(=O)O)N)O

Properties
Chemical formula	C_{64}H_{85}N_{13}O_{18}S_{2}
Molar mass	1388.6 g/mol
- Except where otherwise noted, data are given for materials in their standard state (at 25 °C [77 °F], 100 kPa). Infobox references

Urotensin-II (U-II) is a peptide ligand that is the strongest known vasoconstrictor. Because of the involvement of the UII system in multiple biological systems such as the cardiovascular, nervous, endocrine, and renal, it represents a promising target for the development of new drugs.

In humans, Urotensin-2 is encoded by the UTS2 gene.

== Discovery ==
U-II was initially isolated from the neurosecretory system of the Goby fish (Gillichthys mirabilis). For many years it was thought that U-II does not exhibit significant effects in mammalian systems; a view quickly overturned when it was demonstrated that Goby U-II produces slow relaxation of mouse anococcygeus muscle, in addition to contraction of rat artery segments. In 1998, the genes for Pre-pro U-II were found in mammals proving that the peptide U-II did exist in mammals.

== Structure ==
The U-II gene is located on chromosome 1p36. U-II peptide length varies between species due to the specific cleaving sites located at different spots depending on the species. In humans U-II length is 11 amino acids. The peptide sequence that is needed for biological function for both U-II and urotensin II-Related Peptide (URP) is known as the core. It is hexapeptide (-CYS-TYR-LYS-TRP-PHE-CYS-), and is connected at the two ends by a disulfide bond. Also just like URP the amino terminus can be modified without any loss in pharmacological activity suggesting that it is not needed for activation of the receptor. Unlike URP, U-II has an acidic amino acid (Glutamic or Aspartic) that precedes the core sequence. While the amino acid is not necessary for the activation of urotensin II receptor the fact that it is conserved in different species suggests that it has a biological function that has not been discovered.

== Receptor ==
U-II is an agonist for the urotensin-II receptor which is a G protein-coupled receptor that primarily activates the alpha subunit Gαq11. It activates PKC which then activates PLC which increases the cytosolic calcium concentration. It is found in many peripheral tissues, blood vessels, and also the brainstem cholinergic neurons of the laterodorsal tegmental (LDT) and the pedunculopontine tegmental nuclei (PPT). It is also found in rat astrocytes.

== Tissue localization ==
Pre-pro U-II in both humans and rats are primarily expressed in the motorneurons of the brainstem and spinal cord although it is also found in small amounts in other parts of the brain as well including the frontal lobe and the medulla oblongata. In humans U-II mRNA is also found in other peripheral tissues such as the heart, kidneys, adrenal gland, placenta, spleen, and thymus.

== Function ==
=== Central nervous system ===
When injected intracerebroventricularly (icv) U-II causes an increase in the corticotropin releasing factor by activating the hypothalamic paraventricular neurons. This leads to increased plasma levels of adrenocorticotropic hormones and adrenaline. Rats and mice exhibit many stress related behaviors when injected with U-II which were tested by the elevated plus maze which measures anxiety-like effects, and the hole-board test which measures head dipping which is also an anxiety-like behavior.

U-II when injected icv in rats also leads to cardiovascular responses including raising mean arterial pressure (MAP) and causing tachycardia. When the arcuate nucleus, and the paraventricular nucleus, two different areas of the brain which are known to control blood pressure were injected with U-II simultaneously they caused an increase in blood pressure. When the two areas were injected separately it was discovered that U-II affected the excitatory neurons in the paraventricular nucleus and the inhibitory neurons of the arcuate nucleus.

U-II when injected icv in both rats and mice also stimulates locomotion in familiar environments. This experiment was also tested in rainbow trout (Oncorhynchus mykiss) where a stimulatory effect was also observed.

Depression-like behavior was also observed when U-II was injected in the brain by using the forced swim test and the tail suspension test which are used to compare molecules that are thought to cause anti-depressive-like effects.

Orexigenic behavior which is increased appetite and thirst were also observed after icv injection of U-II in rats.

=== Peripheral tissue effects ===
U-II has a variety of effects on different tissues. In blood vessels it can cause contraction. In rat pancreas U-II inhibits insulin secretion. It also affects the kidneys including sodium transport, lipid and glucose metabolism, and natriuretic effects. It has been linked to cardiac fibrosis and hypertrophy, heart failure, renal dysfunction, and diabetes.
