= CRHBP =

Protein-coding gene in the species Homo sapiens

Identifiers
- Aliases: CRHBP, CRF-BP, CRFBP, corticotropin releasing hormone binding protein
- External IDs: OMIM: 122559; MGI: 88497; HomoloGene: 1418; GeneCards: CRHBP; OMA:CRHBP - orthologs

Gene location (Human)
Chr.	Chromosome 5 (human)
Band	5q13.3	Start	76,953,045 bp
Band	5q13.3	End	76,981,158 bp

Gene location (Mouse)
Chr.	Chromosome 13 (mouse)
Band	13 D1|13 49.5 cM	Start	95,567,879 bp
Band	13 D1|13 49.5 cM	End	95,581,432 bp
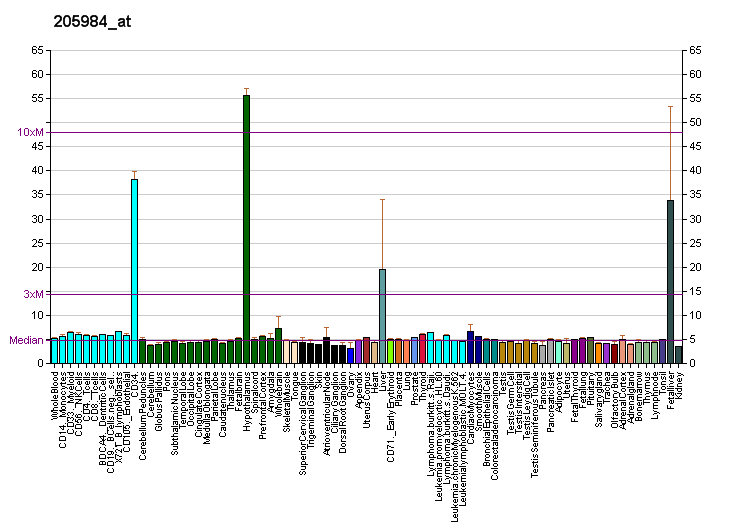
RNA expression pattern
Bgee	Human / Mouse (ortholog); Top expressed in: gonad; spleen; liver; right lobe of liver; prefrontal cortex; testicle; left adrenal cortex; right adrenal cortex; human kidney; hypothalamus / Top expressed in: vestibular membrane of cochlear duct; ciliary body; iris; lens; lumbar subsegment of spinal cord; hippocampus proper; Region I of hippocampus proper; visual cortex; vestibular sensory epithelium; amygdala; More reference expression data
BioGPS	More reference expression data
Gene ontology
Molecular function	corticotropin-releasing hormone binding; protein binding; peptide binding
Cellular component	Golgi apparatus; secretory granule; endoplasmic reticulum; perikaryon; axon terminus; dense core granule; dendrite; varicosity; secondary lysosome; multivesicular body; microtubule; extracellular region; extracellular space; intracellular anatomical structure; nucleus
Biological process	negative regulation of corticotropin secretion; female pregnancy; cellular response to tumor necrosis factor; regulation of corticotropin secretion; cellular response to estrogen stimulus; hormone-mediated signaling pathway; behavioral response to ethanol; learning or memory; regulated exocytosis; inflammatory response; signal transduction; cellular response to potassium ion; cellular response to cocaine; negative regulation of corticotropin-releasing hormone receptor activity; synaptic transmission, dopaminergic; maternal aggressive behavior; hormone metabolic process; cellular response to calcium ion; cellular response to cAMP; cellular response to estradiol stimulus; cellular response to gonadotropin-releasing hormone; regulation of NMDA receptor activity; regulation of cellular response to stress
Sources:Amigo / QuickGO
Orthologs
Species	Human	Mouse
Entrez	1393	12919
Ensembl	ENSG00000145708	ENSMUSG00000021680
UniProt	P24387	Q60571
RefSeq (mRNA)	NM_001882	NM_198408
RefSeq (protein)	NP_001873	NP_940800
Location (UCSC)	Chr 5: 76.95 – 76.98 Mb	Chr 13: 95.57 – 95.58 Mb
PubMed search
- Wikidata
View/Edit Human	View/Edit Mouse

Corticotropin-releasing factor-binding protein is a protein that in humans is encoded by the CRHBP gene. It belongs to corticotropin-releasing hormone binding protein family.

Corticotropin-releasing hormone is a potent stimulator of synthesis and secretion of preopiomelanocortin-derived peptides. Although CRH concentrations in the human peripheral circulation are normally low, they increase throughout pregnancy and fall rapidly after parturition. Maternal plasma CRH probably originates from the placenta. Human plasma contains a CRH-binding protein which inactivates CRH and which may prevent inappropriate pituitary-adrenal stimulation in pregnancy.
