= Urotensin II–related peptide =

UTS2B

Identifiers
- Aliases: UTS2B, U2B, URP, UTS2D, urotensin 2B, UIIB, U-IIB
- External IDs: OMIM: 618134; MGI: 2677064; GeneCards: UTS2B

Gene location (Human)
Chr.	Chromosome 3 (human)
Band	3q28	Start	191,267,168 bp
Band	3q28	End	191,330,526 bp

Gene location (Mouse)
Chr.	Chromosome 16 (mouse)
Band	16|16 B2	Start	27,172,072 bp
Band	16|16 B2	End	27,188,989 bp
RNA expression pattern
Bgee	Human / Mouse (ortholog); Top expressed in: testicle; gonad; secondary oocyte; left testis; right testis; stromal cell of endometrium; smooth muscle tissue; right uterine tube; right lobe of liver; appendix / Top expressed in: neural tube; primary oocyte; muscle of thigh; rhombencephalon; secondary oocyte; heart; muscle tissue; cerebellar cortex; skeletal muscle tissue; thymus; More reference expression data
BioGPS	n/a
Gene ontology
Molecular function	G protein-coupled receptor binding; hormone activity
Cellular component	extracellular region
Biological process	regulation of blood pressure; blood vessel diameter maintenance; regulation of signaling receptor activity; G protein-coupled receptor signaling pathway
Sources:Amigo / QuickGO
Orthologs
Databases	NCBI: entry; OMA: entry
Species	Human	Mouse
Entrez	257313	224065
Ensembl	ENSG00000188958	ENSMUSG00000056423
UniProt	Q765I0	Q765I1
RefSeq (mRNA)	NM_198152	NM_198166
RefSeq (protein)	NP_937795	NP_937809
Location (UCSC)	Chr 3: 191.27 – 191.33 Mb	Chr 16: 27.17 – 27.19 Mb
PubMed search
- Wikidata
View/Edit Human	View/Edit Mouse

Urotensin II–related peptide

Clinical data
- Other names: URP

Physiological data
- Source tissues: organum vasculosum laminae terminalis; median eminence
- Target tissues: system-wide
- Receptors: Urotensin II Receptor
- Agonists: Direct: Urotensin-II
- Antagonists: BIM23127, GSK 1562590 hydrochloride, SB 611812, SB 657510, SB 706375, UFP 803, Urantide, Orn5-URP
- Precursor: Prepro-URP

Identifiers
- IUPAC name: N-{[(4R,7S,10S,13S,16S,19R)-19-(L-alanylamino)-10-(4-aminobutyl)-16-(cyclohexylmethyl)-7-(4-hydroxybenzyl)-13-(1H-indol-3-ylmethyl)-6,9,12,15,18-pentaoxo-1,2-dithia-5,8,11,14,17-pentaazacycloicosan-4-yl]carbonyl}-L-valine
- CAS Number: 342878-90-4
- PubChem CID: 72793454
- KEGG: hsa:257313

Urotensin II-related peptide (URP) is a hormone that in humans is encoded by the gene UTS2B. URP is a cyclic neuropeptide that is found in all vertebrates that have been genome sequenced so far. It has a long lasting hypotensive effect and may also regulate reproduction. It is part of the Urotensin II system and is one of the two endogenous ligands for rats, mice, and possibly humans.

== Discovery ==
URP was discovered in rats when researchers were trying to locate urotensin II (UII), a neuropeptide that is a potent vasoconstrictor and increases REM cycles in the brain. The researchers designed antibodies using Goby UII as an antigen that would target the specific peptide sequence CFWKYC. When the peptide was observed using a mass spectrometer the scientists discovered this peptide was smaller than UII but had similar characteristics as well which is why it was called Urotensin II-related peptide.

== Structure ==
The URP gene is located on the 3q28 chromosome of humans. The mature URP peptide is only 8 amino acids long making it smaller than UII. URP is also the same across all vertebrates because it has the same cleaving site unlike UII whose cleaving sites vary among species making its sequence different for all species. URP has the same cysteine bridged hexapeptide ring with the sequence CFWKYC as UII. This is known as the core and is the major site of action on the peptide. Destruction of the core leads to immediate loss of biological activity. On the other hand, the amino terminus of URP doesn’t seem to contain any relevant information because it can be modified without any loss in pharmacological activity. Unlike UII, URP doesn’t have an acidic amino acid (either glutamic acid or aspartic acid) preceding its core. It is still a potent agonist for the UII- receptor which suggests that this acidic amino acid is not required for activation of the receptor.

The peptide sequence for URP is:

Alanine-Cysteine-Phenylalanine-Tryptophan-Lysine-Tyrosine-Cysteine-Valine

== Receptor ==
URP is an agonist for the UII receptor which is a G protein-coupled receptor with the alpha subunit Gαq11. This activates PKC which then activates PLC which increases the intercellular calcium concentration. It is found in many peripheral tissues, blood vessels, and also the brainstem cholinergic neurons of the laterodorsal tegmental (LDT) and the pedunculopontine tegmental nuclei (PPT).

== Tissue Localization ==
Prepro-URP which is the precursor to the mature URP peptide is found in various tissues including specific parts of the brain such as frontal lobe and hypothalamus, and other peripheral tissues such as heart, kidneys, lungs, placenta, ovaries, and testes. In humans the amount of UII and URP gene expression are comparable except in the spinal cord where UII gene expression is much higher.

In rats the UII gene expression is higher than the URP gene expression throughout the entire body. However, when the brains of the rats were tested, only the URP peptide was found making it the primary endogenous ligand in the brain.

Unlike humans and rats, URP gene expression is found in mice spinal cords.

== Function ==
=== Cardiovascular ===
When URP is injected into rats a long hypotensive response will be observed. UII is known as a vasoconstrictor meaning that even though both are agonists for the same receptor they can produce opposite effects

=== CNS ===
Axons that react to URP are primarily found in organum vasculosum laminae terminalis (OVLT) and in the median eminence (ME). These axons are located near the hypothalamus and almost always contain the hormone Gondotropin- releasing hormone (GnRH) which was found through in situ hybridization which provides information of the anatomical location URP mRNA. This means that URP might have an effect on reproduction which has not been discovered .

== Binding between UII and URP ==
Since they are both ligands for the same receptor, an experiment was done to determine which ligand had a higher affinity. When the binding of the two were compared and tested, URP actually had higher affinity.
