= Pexacerfont =

Chemical compound

Clinical data
- Routes of administration: Oral
- ATC code: None

Legal status
- Legal status: In general: uncontrolled

Identifiers
- IUPAC name: 8-(6-methoxy-2-methylpyridin-3-yl)-2,7-dimethyl-N-[(1R)-1-methylpropyl]pyrazolo[1,5-a]-1,3,5-triazin-4-amine
- CAS Number: 459856-18-9
- PubChem CID: 9884366
- ChemSpider: 8060040
- UNII: LF1VBG4ZUK
- KEGG: D10022
- CompTox Dashboard (EPA): DTXSID60196675

Chemical and physical data
- Formula: C_{18}H_{24}N_{6}O
- Molar mass: 340.431 g·mol^{−1}
- 3D model (JSmol): Interactive image
- SMILES: CC[C@@H](C)NC1=NC(=NC2=C(C(=NN21)C)C3=C(N=C(C=C3)OC)C)C
- InChI: InChI=1S/C18H24N6O/c1-7-10(2)19-18-22-13(5)21-17-16(12(4)23-24(17)18)14-8-9-15(25-6)20-11(14)3/h8-10H,7H2,1-6H3,(H,19,21,22)/t10-/m1/s1; Key:LBWQSAZEYIZZCE-SNVBAGLBSA-N

Pexacerfont (INN, previously known as BMS-562,086) is a drug developed by Bristol-Myers Squibb which acts as a CRF_{1} antagonist.

Corticotropin-releasing factor (CRF), also known as corticotropin-releasing hormone, is an endogenous peptide hormone which is released in response to various triggers such as chronic stress. This then triggers the release of corticotropin (ACTH), another hormone which is involved in the physiological response to stress. Chronic release of CRF and ACTH is believed to be directly or indirectly involved in many of the harmful physiological effects of chronic stress, such as excessive glucocorticoid release, diabetes mellitus, osteoporosis, stomach ulcers, anxiety, depression, and development of high blood pressure and consequent cardiovascular problems.

Pexacerfont is a recently developed CRF-1 antagonist which was in clinical trials for the treatment of anxiety disorders, and has also been proposed to be useful for the treatment of depression and irritable bowel syndrome.

A recent multicenter, randomized, double-blind, placebo-controlled trial found that pexacerfont (100 mg/day) did not separate from placebo on the primary outcome measure (the mean change from baseline to end point in the Hamilton Anxiety Scale score). These results suggest that blockade of CRF_{1} receptor may not be a feasible treatment for anxiety disorders in certain human populations.

== See also ==
- Corticotropin releasing hormone antagonists
  - Antalarmin
  - CP-154,526
  - Emicerfont
  - Verucerfont
