= CP-154,526 =

Names
- Preferred IUPAC name N-Butyl-N-ethyl-2,5-dimethyl-7-(2,4,6-trimethylphenyl)-7H-pyrrolo[3,2-e]pyrimidin-4-amine

Identifiers
CAS Number	157286-86-7
3D model (JSmol)	Interactive image
ChEMBL	ChEMBL9946
ChemSpider	4470592
IUPHAR/BPS	3495
PubChem CID	5311055
UNII	9A549FB00R
CompTox Dashboard (EPA)	DTXSID201027582
- InChI: InChI=1S/C23H32N4/c1-8-10-11-26(9-2)22-20-18(6)14-27(23(20)25-19(7)24-22)21-16(4)12-15(3)13-17(21)5/h12-14H,8-11H2,1-7H3 Key: FHQYJZCJRZHINA-UHFFFAOYSA-N; InChI=1/C23H32N4/c1-8-10-11-26(9-2)22-20-18(6)14-27(23(20)25-19(7)24-22)21-16(4)12-15(3)13-17(21)5/h12-14H,8-11H2,1-7H3 Key: FHQYJZCJRZHINA-UHFFFAOYAW
- SMILES: CCCCN(CC)C1=NC(=NC2=C1C(=CN2C3=C(C=C(C=C3C)C)C)C)C

Properties
Chemical formula	C_{23}H_{32}N_{4}
Molar mass	364.52698
- Except where otherwise noted, data are given for materials in their standard state (at 25 °C [77 °F], 100 kPa). verify (what is ?) Infobox references

CP-154,526 is a potent and selective antagonist of the corticotropin releasing hormone receptor 1 developed by Pfizer.

CP-154,526 is under investigation for the potential treatment of alcoholism.

== See also ==
- Antalarmin
- Pexacerfont
- Corticotropin releasing hormone antagonist
