= Urocortin =

UCN
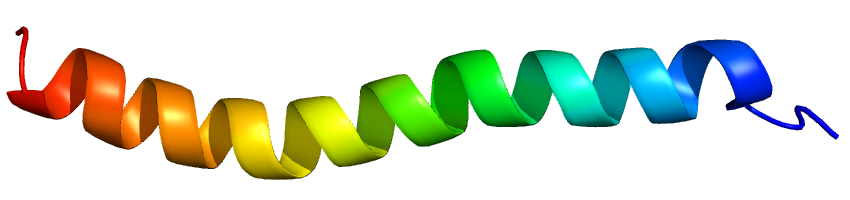

Identifiers
- Aliases: UCN, UI, UROC, urocortin
- External IDs: OMIM: 600945; MGI: 1276123; GeneCards: UCN
Available structures
PDB	Ortholog search: PDBe RCSB
PDB	List of PDB id codes 2RMF, 3N96

Gene location (Human)
Chr.	Chromosome 2 (human)
Band	2p23.3	Start	27,307,400 bp
Band	2p23.3	End	27,308,445 bp

Gene location (Mouse)
Chr.	Chromosome 5 (mouse)
Band	5 B1|5 17.11 cM	Start	31,295,407 bp
Band	5 B1|5 17.11 cM	End	31,296,173 bp
RNA expression pattern
Bgee	Human / Mouse (ortholog); Top expressed in: middle temporal gyrus; Brodmann area 23; primary visual cortex; right frontal lobe; Brodmann area 9; nucleus accumbens; gastrocnemius muscle; putamen; caudate nucleus; apex of heart / Top expressed in: muscle of thigh; embryo; central gray substance of midbrain; embryo; facial motor nucleus; skeletal muscle tissue; lip; esophagus; superior frontal gyrus; quadriceps femoris muscle; More reference expression data
BioGPS	n/a
Gene ontology
Molecular function	histone deacetylase inhibitor activity; hormone activity; protein binding; neuropeptide hormone activity; G protein-coupled receptor binding; corticotropin-releasing hormone receptor 1 binding; corticotropin-releasing hormone receptor 2 binding; corticotropin-releasing hormone activity
Cellular component	axon terminus; perikaryon; varicosity; axon; dendrite; soma; extracellular region; extracellular space
Biological process	positive regulation of collagen biosynthetic process; G protein-coupled receptor signaling pathway; negative regulation of histone deacetylation; activation of protein kinase A activity; response to estradiol; positive regulation of protein phosphorylation; associative learning; startle response; gastric emptying; negative regulation of blood pressure; female pregnancy; negative regulation of gastric acid secretion; negative regulation of apoptotic process; response to glucocorticoid; hearing; pancreatic juice secretion; response to oxidative stress; negative regulation of appetite; positive regulation of translation; negative regulation of gene expression; negative regulation of cell death; positive regulation of peptidyl-serine phosphorylation; positive regulation of DNA replication; aerobic dissimilation; positive regulation of calcium ion import; positive regulation of cell growth; positive regulation of vascular permeability; positive regulation of gene expression; drinking behavior; response to pain; positive regulation of cardiac muscle contraction; feeding behavior; positive regulation of interleukin-6 production; response to auditory stimulus; learning or memory; social behavior; regulation of synaptic transmission, glutamatergic; inflammatory response; neuropeptide signaling pathway; neuron projection development; negative regulation of necrotic cell death; positive regulation of behavioral fear response; negative regulation of cell size; positive regulation of transcription by RNA polymerase II; negative regulation of neuron death; negative regulation of hormone secretion; negative regulation of feeding behavior; regulation of signaling receptor activity; positive regulation of cAMP-mediated signaling; positive regulation of corticotropin secretion; negative regulation of epinephrine secretion; positive regulation of cortisol secretion; negative regulation of glucagon secretion
Sources:Amigo / QuickGO
Orthologs
Databases	NCBI: entry; OMA: entry
Species	Human	Mouse
Entrez	7349	22226
Ensembl	ENSG00000163794	ENSMUSG00000038676
UniProt	P55089	P81615
RefSeq (mRNA)	NM_003353	NM_021290; NM_001346010
RefSeq (protein)	NP_003344	NP_001332939; NP_067265
Location (UCSC)	Chr 2: 27.31 – 27.31 Mb	Chr 5: 31.3 – 31.3 Mb
PubMed search
- Wikidata
View/Edit Human	View/Edit Mouse

Urocortin is a protein that in humans is encoded by the UCN gene. Urocortin belongs to the corticotropin-releasing factor (CRF) family of proteins which includes CRF, urotensin I, sauvagine, urocortin II and urocortin III. Urocortin is involved in the mammalian stress response, and regulates aspects of appetite and stress response.

== Structure, localization, and interactions ==
Urocortin is a peptide composed of 40 amino acids. Urocortin is composed of a single alpha helix structure. The human UCN gene contains two exons, and the entirety of the coding region is contained within the second exon. Urocortin is expressed widely in the central and peripheral nervous systems, with a pattern similar to that of CRF. Areas of similarity between urocortin and CRF expression include the supraoptic nucleus and the hippocampus. Urocortin is also expressed in areas distinct from CRF expression; these areas notably include the median eminence, the Edinger-Westphal nucleus, and the sphenoid nucleus. Additionally, Urocortin is expressed in peripheral tissues such as the heart.

Urocortin is known to interact both with the CRF type 1 and CRF type 2 receptors. Furthermore, Urocortin is thought to be the primary ligand for the CRF type 2 receptor, as it has higher binding affinity for the CRF type 2 receptor than CRF. Additionally, urocortin interacts with CRF Binding Protein in the mammalian brain.

== Stress response and social behavior ==
Urocortin is closely related to CRF, which mediates the mammalian stress response. Urocortin is consequently implicated in a number of stress responses, primarily relating to appetite and food intake. Administration of urocortin to the central nervous system of mice and rats has been shown to decrease appetite. Additionally, central urocortin treatment increases anxiety-linked behaviors and increases motor activity in mice and rats. These general anxiety-linked behaviors are likely induced through the CRF type 1 receptor, and the appetite behaviors are likely induced through the CRF type 2 receptor. The reduction in appetite from urocortin treatment could be a result of suppression of gastric emptying and/or hypoglycemia, which have been shown to result from urocortin treatment. Urocortin expression is stimulated in response to osmotic stress; water deprivation in rats has been shown to induce urocortin expression in the supraoptic nucleus.

Montane Voles and Meadow Voles are closely related species of voles which are regularly studied as a model for social and mating behavior. The distribution of urocortin-expressing neurons differs in meadow voles compared to montane voles, suggesting urocortin may also play a role in modulating social behavior in some species.

== Cardiovascular effects ==
Urocortin has been shown to induce increases in heart rate and coronary blood flow when applied peripherally. These effects are likely mediated through the CRF type 2 receptor, as this receptor is found in the cardiac atria and ventricles. Urocortin also functions to protect cardiovascular tissue from ischemic injury. Urocortin's cardiovascular effects separate it from other members of the CRF family, and likely represent its primary biological function.

== In non-mammals ==
Urocortin is not present in all non-mammals; the closet analogue in teleost fish is urotensin I. However, in amphibian species such as Xenopus laevis, urocortin is expressed in tissues such as brain, pituitary, kidney, heart, and skin. Urocortin in Xenopus has been shown to increase cAMP accumulation and inhibit appetite
