= Antalarmin =

Chemical compound

Clinical data
- Other names: Antalarmin
- ATC code: none

Legal status
- Legal status: In general: legal

Identifiers
- IUPAC name: N-Butyl-N-ethyl-2,5,6-trimethyl-7-(2,4,6-trimethylphenyl)pyrrolo[3,2-e]pyrimidin-4-amine
- CAS Number: 157284-96-3
- PubChem CID: 177990
- IUPHAR/BPS: 3489
- ChemSpider: 154945
- UNII: G3DNT7X7YL
- ChEBI: CHEBI:139557
- ChEMBL: ChEMBL296641
- CompTox Dashboard (EPA): DTXSID50166241

Chemical and physical data
- Formula: C_{24}H_{34}N_{4}
- Molar mass: 378.564 g·mol^{−1}
- 3D model (JSmol): Interactive image
- SMILES: n1c2c(c(nc1C)N(CC)CCCC)c(c(n2c3c(cc(cc3C)C)C)C)C
- InChI: InChI=1S/C24H34N4/c1-9-11-12-27(10-2)23-21-18(6)19(7)28(24(21)26-20(8)25-23)22-16(4)13-15(3)14-17(22)5/h13-14H,9-12H2,1-8H3; Key:IXPROWGEHNVJOY-UHFFFAOYSA-N

Antalarmin (CP-156,181) is a drug that acts as a CRH1 antagonist.

Corticotropin-releasing hormone (CRH), also known as Corticotropin-releasing factor, is an endogenous peptide hormone released in response to various triggers such as chronic stress and drug addiction. Such triggers result in the release of corticotropin (ACTH), another hormone involved in the physiological response to stress. Chronic release of CRH and ACTH is believed to be directly or indirectly involved in many of the harmful physiological effects of chronic stress, such as excessive glucocorticoid release, stomach ulcers, anxiety, diabetes mellitus, osteoporosis, depression, and development of high blood pressure and consequent cardiovascular problems.

Antalarmin is a non-peptide drug that blocks the CRH1 receptor, and, as a consequence, reduces the release of ACTH in response to chronic stress. This has been demonstrated in animals to reduce the behavioral responses to stressful situations, and it is proposed that antalarmin itself, or more likely newer CRH1 antagonist drugs still under development, could be useful for reducing the adverse health consequences of chronic stress in humans, as well as having possible uses in the treatment of conditions such as anxiety, depression, and drug addiction.

== Chemical structure ==
The synthesis of CP-154,526, a non-peptide antagonist of the CRH1 receptor, was first described in 1997. Antalarmin is a close analog that is highly structurally similar and has been shown to be easier to synthesize. The findings from several chemical, pharmacokinetic and pharmacological studies indicate that the two compounds possess very similar properties.

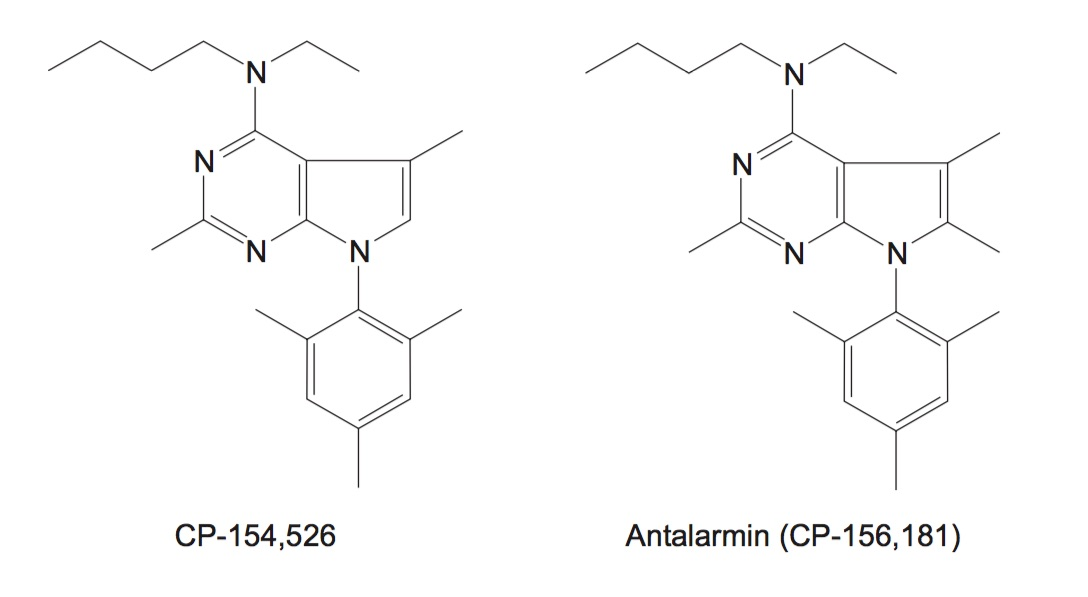
Chemical structure of CRH1 receptor Non-peptide Antagonist CP-154,526 and its close analog, Antalarmin (CP-156,181)

== Mechanism of action ==
=== Receptor binding ===
As shown in Table 1, adenylyl cyclase and cAMP assays were used in various functional studies to determine the amount of cAMP inhibition by two CRH1 receptor antagonists: antalarmin and CP-154,526.

Functional Data for antalarmin (CP-156,181) and CP-154,526
Tissue	Type of Assay	Compound	Parameter
Human SH-SY5Y (Neuroblastoma)	cAMP	Antalarmin	pKb = 9.19
Human Y79 Cells (Retinoblastoma)	cAMP	Antalarmin	IC50 = 0.8 nM
Human SH-SY5Y	cAMP	CP-154,526	pKb = 7.76
Rat Cortex	Cyclase	CP-154,526	Ki = 3.7 nM

Several receptor binding studies have shown that antalarmin and CP-154,526 have high affinity for CRH1 receptors, with very similar profiles. Table 2 shows the binding affinities of each compound in various cell lines.

CRH1 receptor binding affinity for antalarmin and CP-154,526
Tissue	Compound	Ki (nM)	IC50 (nM)
Rat Pituitary	Antalarmin	1.9	0.04
Rat Frontal Cortex	Antalarmin	1.4	
Human Clone	Antalarmin	6	5
Rat Pituitary	CP-154,526	1.4	
Rat Cortex	CP-154,526	5.7	
Human Clone	CP-154,526	10	

== Pharmacokinetics (ADME) ==
The pharmacokinetics of CP-154,526, a close analog of antalarmin, have been investigated in male Sprauge-Dawley rats via intravenous (i.v.) and oral (p.o.) routes. Following a 5 mg/kg dose (i.v.) of CP-154,526, drug concentrations followed a biphasic decline over time. CP-154,526 also demonstrated a large volume of distribution (Vd) at 6.7 L/kg, indicating extensive binding of the drug to tissue in Sprauge-Dawley rats. A plasma clearance of 82 ml/min/kg was observed with an estimated elimination half-life of 1.5 hours. Following p.o. administration at a dose of 10 mg/kg, an average peak plasma concentration (Cmax) of 367 ng/mL was determined within 0.5-1 hour of administration. The oral bioavailability was calculated to be 37%, resulting in an estimated hepatic clearance of 63%.

In male Wistar rats given a 5 mg/kg dose (p.o) of CP-154,526, an oral bioavailability of 27% and high volume of distribution at 105 L/kg was determined, with an estimated total clearance (CLt) of 36 ml/min/kg. CP-154,526 was also observed to cross the blood-brain barrier with good penetrance at a 2.5 brain:plasma ratio 8 hours following oral administration. An extensive pharmacokinetic study of antalarmin conducted in macaques reported an oral bioavailability of 19%, a total clearance of 4.5 L/hr/kg, and an elimination half-life of 7.8 hours following a 20 mg/kg administration (p.o.). This same dose also resulted in mean antalarmin plasma levels of 76 ng/ml and CSF levels of 9.8 ng/ml at 3 hours post-administration.

== In vitro and in vivo research ==
Results so far have had limited success, with various CRF antagonists being tested, which showed some antidepressant effects, but failed to produce an effect comparable with conventional antidepressant drugs. However, more positive results were seen when antalarmin was combined with an SSRI antidepressant, suggesting a potential for synergistic effect. Encouraging results have also been observed using antalarmin as a potential treatment for anxiety and stress-induced hypertension.

Initial studies investigating CP-154,526 showed that the compound binds with high affinity to cortical and pituitary CRH receptors across several species. Additionally, systemic administration of CP-154,526 fully antagonizes the effects of exogenous CRH on ACTH levels, cell firing in the locus coeruleus, and fear potentiation in animal models. However, this potent and selective compound demonstrated low oral bioavailability, and in vitro studies using human liver microsomes predicted high hepatic clearance, deeming the compound unsuitable for clinical development. Nevertheless, many investigators continue to study CP-154,526 and its close analogs (e.g. antalarmin), using them as tools to examine the physiology of CRH and CRH receptors, as well as to determine the potential therapeutic value of CRH1 antagonists in several CNS and peripheral disorders.

=== Stress and anxiety ===
In vitro studies examining the effects of CRH1 antagonists on the hypothalamic–pituitary–adrenal axis showed that antalarmin inhibited ACTH release in rat anterior pituitary cells, as well as inhibited cortisol synthesis and release in human adrenal cells. In vivo studies revealed that pre-treating rats with antalarmin inhibited increases in plasma ACTH following CRH injection (i.v.), with no effect on baseline levels. However, another study demonstrated that 8 weeks of antalarmin administered twice daily (i.p.) in rats significantly lowered basal ACTH and corticosterone levels, resulting in reduced adrenocortical responsiveness to ACTH. When antalarmin was administered to primates, it also inhibited increases in plasma ACTH, as well as prevented the anxiety response produced by a social stressor (e.g. presentation of another male in an unfamiliar environment).

With regards to neurochemical effects, antalarmin has been shown to inhibit increases in extracellular cortical norepinephrine induced by rat tail pinch, suggesting that CHR1 receptors may be implicated in stress-evoked norepinephrine release in the cortex. Antalarmin was also shown to have electrophysiological effects by partially reversing the inhibition of neuronal firing in the dorsal raphe nucleus that occurs following intracerebroventricular (i.c.v) administration of CRH.

Studies using CRH receptor antagonists such as antalarmin in anxiety models have shown that these agents produce effects similar to clinically effective anxiolytics. In conditioned fear models, antalarmin reduced conditioned freezing behavior, suggesting that it blocked the development and expression of conditioned fear, and implicating CRH1 receptors in both processes. Oral administration of antalarmin (3–30 mg/kg) also significantly reduced immobility in a rat model of behavioral despair, with effects similar to the SSRI fluoxetine.

=== Neurodegeneration ===
CRH has also been shown to promote neurodegeneration, suggesting that CRH1 antagonists may have neuroprotective effects. PC12 cells are derived from the rat adrenal medulla and are extensively used to study neural differentiation. PC12 cells treated with CRH (1-10 nM) showed increased numbers of apoptotic cells and upregulation of the Fas ligand via p38 activation, demonstrating the pro-apoptotic effects of CRH. Administration of antalarmin (10 nM) completely blocked the CRH-induced apoptosis response and inhibited Fas ligand expression.

=== Inflammation ===
Antalarmin has also been used extensively to study the role of CRH in inflammation. Intraperitoneal (i.p.) administration of antalarmin in rats significantly inhibited the inflammation caused by subcutaneous administration of carrageenan (a known inflammatory food additive) as measured by leukocyte concentrations. In a rat skin mast cell activation model, pre-treatment with Antalarmin (10 mg/kg, i.v.) inhibited the CRH-stimulated induction of mast cell degranulation, suggesting pro-inflammatory properties of CRH. Antalarmin also blocked the vascular permeability and mast cell degranulation response induced by intradermal Urocortin (10 nM). Collectively, these results indicate that during stress, CRH leads to the activation of skin mast cells through the CRH1 receptor which triggers vasodilation and increased vascular permeability.

Chronic antalarmin treatment also showed anti-inflammatory effects and has been suggested as having potential uses in the treatment of inflammatory conditions such as arthritis, as well as stress-induced gastrointestinal ulcers and irritable bowel syndrome.

=== Addiction ===
Mixed results have been seen in research into the use of antalarmin and other CRF-1 antagonists in the treatment of drug addiction disorders. Tests of antalarmin on cocaine use in cocaine-addicted monkeys produced only slight reductions of use that were not statistically significant; however, in tests on cocaine-addicted rats, antalarmin did prevent dose escalation with prolonged use, suggesting that it might stabilize cocaine use and prevent it increasing over time, although without consistently reducing it.

Antalarmin also showed positive effects in reducing withdrawal syndrome from chronic opioid use, and significantly reduced self-administration of ethanol in ethanol-addicted rodents.

Overall, additional research is needed to determine the therapeutic efficacy of antalarmin and other CRH non-peptide antagonists in anxiety, depression, inflammation, neurodegenerative disease, and addiction.

== See also ==
- CP-154,526
- Pexacerfont
- Corticotropin-releasing hormone antagonist
