= UCN2 =

Protein-coding gene in the species Homo sapiens

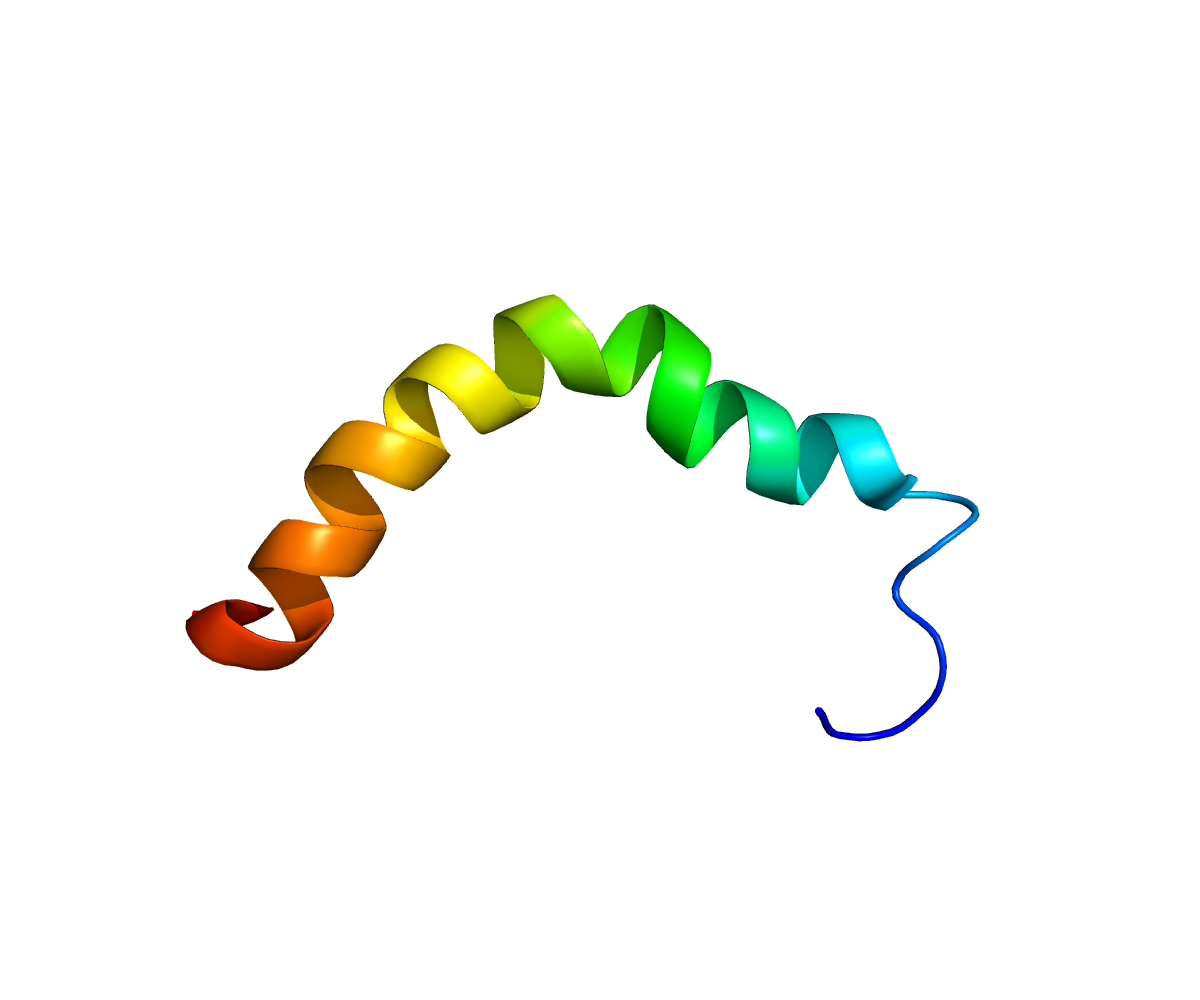

Identifiers
- Aliases: UCN2, SRP, UCN-II, UCNI, UR, URP, urocortin 2
- External IDs: OMIM: 605902; MGI: 2176375; GeneCards: UCN2
Available structures
PDB	Ortholog search: PDBe RCSB
PDB	List of PDB id codes 2RMG, 3N95

Gene location (Human)
Chr.	Chromosome 3 (human)
Band	3p21.31	Start	48,561,718 bp
Band	3p21.31	End	48,563,781 bp

Gene location (Mouse)
Chr.	Chromosome 9 (mouse)
Band	9|9 F2	Start	108,815,078 bp
Band	9|9 F2	End	108,816,232 bp
RNA expression pattern
Bgee	Human / Mouse (ortholog); Top expressed in: stromal cell of endometrium; testicle; skin of abdomen; skin of leg; olfactory zone of nasal mucosa; vagina; prostate; minor salivary glands; ectocervix; tibial nerve / Top expressed in: saccule; otic vesicle; otic placode; blastocyst; embryo; muscle of thigh; morula; esophagus; lip; skin of external ear; More reference expression data
BioGPS	n/a
Gene ontology
Molecular function	hormone binding; G protein-coupled receptor binding; corticotropin-releasing hormone receptor 2 binding; hormone activity; corticotropin-releasing hormone receptor binding
Cellular component	extracellular region; extracellular space; intracellular anatomical structure
Biological process	digestion; cellular response to nutrient levels; regulation of signaling receptor activity; response to stress; adenylate cyclase-activating G protein-coupled receptor signaling pathway; hormone-mediated signaling pathway
Sources:Amigo / QuickGO
Orthologs
Databases	NCBI: entry; OMA: entry
Species	Human	Mouse
Entrez	90226	171530
Ensembl	ENSG00000145040	ENSMUSG00000049699
UniProt	Q96RP3	Q99ML8
RefSeq (mRNA)	NM_033199	NM_145077
RefSeq (protein)	NP_149976	NP_659543
Location (UCSC)	Chr 3: 48.56 – 48.56 Mb	Chr 9: 108.82 – 108.82 Mb
PubMed search
- Wikidata
View/Edit Human	View/Edit Mouse

Urocortin-2 is a protein that in humans is encoded by the UCN2 gene.

This gene is a member of the sauvagine/corticotropin-releasing factor/urotensin I family. It is structurally related to the corticotropin-releasing factor (CRF) gene and the encoded product is an endogenous ligand for CRF type 2 receptors. In the brain it may be responsible for the effects of stress on appetite. In spite of the gene family name similarity, the product of this gene has no sequence similarity to urotensin II.
