= Corticotropin-releasing factor family =

Identifiers
- Symbol: CRF
- Pfam: PF00473
- InterPro: IPR000187
- PROSITE: PDOC00442
- SCOP2: 1goe / SCOPe / SUPFAM
Available protein structures:
- PDB: IPR000187 PF00473 (ECOD; PDBsum)
- AlphaFold: IPR000187; PF00473

Corticotropin-releasing factor family, CRF family is a family of related neuropeptides in vertebrates. This family includes corticotropin-releasing hormone (also known as CRF), urotensin-I, urocortin, and sauvagine. The family can be grouped into 2 separate paralogous lineages, with urotensin-I, urocortin and sauvagine in one group and CRH forming the other group. Urocortin and sauvagine appear to represent orthologues of fish urotensin-I in mammals and amphibians, respectively. The peptides have a variety of physiological effects on stress and anxiety, vasoregulation, thermoregulation, growth and metabolism, metamorphosis and reproduction in various species, and are all released as prohormones.

Corticotropin-releasing hormone (CRH) is a releasing hormone found mainly in the paraventricular nucleus of the mammalian hypothalamus that regulates the release of corticotropin (ACTH) from the pituitary gland. The paraventricular nucleus transports CRH to the anterior pituitary, stimulating adrenocorticotropic hormone (ACTH) release via CRH type 1 receptors, thereby activating the hypothalamic-pituitary-adrenal axis (HPA) and, thus, glucocorticoid release.

CRH is evolutionary-related to a number of other active peptides. Urocortin acts in vitro to stimulate the secretion of adrenocorticotropic hormone. Urotensin is found in the teleost caudal neurosecretory system and may play a role in osmoregulation and as a corticotropin-releasing factor. Urotensin-I is released from the urophysis of fish, and produces ACTH and subsequent cortisol release in vivo. The nonhormonal portion of the prohormone is thought to be the urotensin binding protein (urophysin). Sauvagine, isolated from frog skin, has a potent hypotensive and antidiuretic effect.

== Subfamilies ==
- Urocortin InterPro: IPR003620

== Human proteins from this family ==
- Corticotropin-releasing hormone (CRH)
- Urocortin (UCN)
