= Corticotropin-releasing hormone receptor 2 =

Protein found in humans

CRHR2

Identifiers
- Aliases: CRHR2, CRF-RB, CRF2, CRFR2, HM-CRF, corticotropin releasing hormone receptor 2
- External IDs: OMIM: 602034; MGI: 894312; GeneCards: CRHR2
Available structures
PDB	Ortholog search: PDBe RCSB
PDB	List of PDB id codes 3N93, 3N95, 3N96

Gene location (Human)
Chr.	Chromosome 7 (human)
Band	7p14.3	Start	30,651,942 bp
Band	7p14.3	End	30,700,129 bp

Gene location (Mouse)
Chr.	Chromosome 6 (mouse)
Band	6 B3|6 27.33 cM	Start	55,067,034 bp
Band	6 B3|6 27.33 cM	End	55,110,001 bp
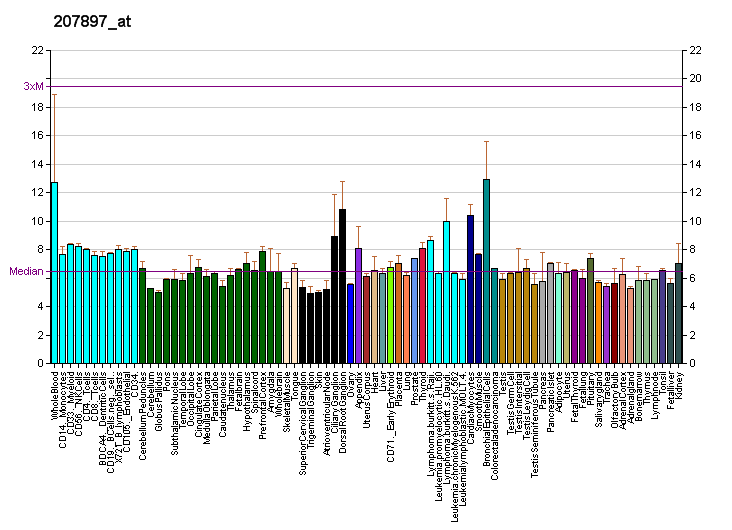

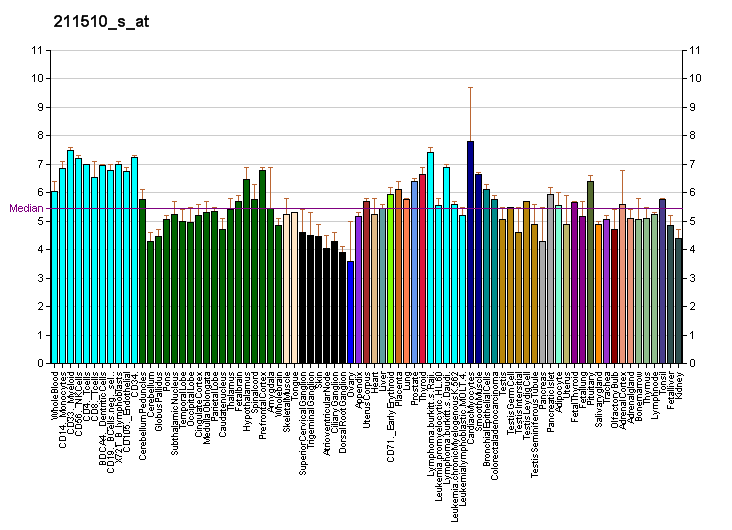
RNA expression pattern
Bgee	Human / Mouse (ortholog); Top expressed in: testicle; ganglionic eminence; ventricular zone; apex of heart; anterior pituitary; muscle of thigh; right frontal lobe; left ventricle; gonad; prefrontal cortex / Top expressed in: muscle of thigh; masseter muscle; skeletal muscle tissue; soleus muscle; lumbar spinal ganglion; lip; embryo; esophagus; intercostal muscle; extraocular muscle; More reference expression data
BioGPS	More reference expression data
Gene ontology
Molecular function	G protein-coupled receptor activity; signal transducer activity; protein binding; corticotrophin-releasing factor receptor activity; transmembrane signaling receptor activity; peptide hormone binding; corticotropin-releasing hormone receptor activity
Cellular component	integral component of membrane; membrane; plasma membrane; integral component of plasma membrane; axon; dendrite; axon terminus
Biological process	adenylate cyclase-modulating G protein-coupled receptor signaling pathway; cell surface receptor signaling pathway; signal transduction; cellular response to corticotropin-releasing hormone stimulus; G protein-coupled receptor signaling pathway; hormone-mediated signaling pathway; long-term potentiation
Sources:Amigo / QuickGO
Orthologs
Databases	NCBI: entry; OMA: entry
Species	Human	Mouse
Entrez	1395	12922
Ensembl	ENSG00000106113	ENSMUSG00000003476
UniProt	Q13324	Q60748
RefSeq (mRNA)	NM_001202475; NM_001202481; NM_001202482; NM_001202483; NM_001883	NM_001288618; NM_001288619; NM_001288620; NM_009953
RefSeq (protein)	NP_001189404; NP_001189410; NP_001189411; NP_001189412; NP_001874	NP_001275547; NP_001275548; NP_001275549; NP_034083
Location (UCSC)	Chr 7: 30.65 – 30.7 Mb	Chr 6: 55.07 – 55.11 Mb
PubMed search
- Wikidata
View/Edit Human	View/Edit Mouse

Corticotropin-releasing hormone receptor 2 (CRHR2) is a protein, also known by the IUPHAR-recommended name CRF_{2}, that is encoded by the CRHR2 gene and occurs on the surfaces of some mammalian cells. CRF_{2} receptors are type 2 G protein-coupled receptors for corticotropin-releasing hormone (CRH) that are resident in the plasma membranes of hormone-sensitive cells. CRH, a peptide of 41 amino acids synthesized in the hypothalamus, is the principal neuroregulator of the hypothalamic-pituitary-adrenal axis, signaling via guanine nucleotide-binding proteins (G proteins) and downstream effectors such as adenylate cyclase. The CRF_{2} receptor is a multi-pass membrane protein with a transmembrane domain composed of seven helices arranged in a V-shape. CRF_{2} receptors are activated by two structurally similar peptides, urocortin II, and urocortin III, as well as CRH.

== Properties ==
The human CRHR2 gene contains 12 exons. Three major functional isoforms, alpha (411 amino acids), beta (438 amino acids), and gamma (397 amino acids), encoded by transcripts with alternative first exons, differ only in the N-terminal sequence comprising the signal peptide and part of the extracellular domain (amino acids 18-108 of CRHR2 alpha); the unique N-terminal sequence of each isoform (34 amino acids in CRHR2 alpha; 61 amino acids in Hs CRHR2 beta; 20 amino acids in CRHR2 gamma) is followed by a sequence common to all isoforms (377 amino acids) comprising most of the multi-pass transmembrane domain followed by a cytoplasmic domain of 47 amino acids.

CRHR2 beta is expressed in the human brain; CRHR2 alpha predominates in peripheral tissues. The N-terminal signal peptides of corticotropin-releasing hormone receptor 1 and CRHR2 beta are cleaved off in the endoplasmic reticulum to yield the mature receptors. In contrast, CRHR2 alpha contains a unique pseudo signal peptide that is not removed from the mature receptor. In adenylate cyclase activation assays, CRH-related peptides are 10 times more potent at stimulating CRHR2 beta than CRHR2 alpha and CRHR2 gamma, suggesting that the N-terminal sequence is involved in the ligand-receptor interaction.

== See also ==
- Corticotropin-releasing hormone receptor
