= Corticotropin-releasing hormone antagonist =

A Corticotropin-releasing hormone antagonist (CRH antagonist) is a specific type of receptor antagonist that blocks the receptor sites for corticotropin-releasing hormone, also known as corticotropin-releasing factor (CRF), which synchronizes the behavioral, endocrine, autonomic, and immune responses to stress by controlling the hypothalamic-pituitary-adrenal axis (HPA axis). CRH antagonists thereby block the consequent secretions of ACTH and cortisol due to stress, among other effects.

== CRH receptor subtypes ==
There are four subtypes of the CRH receptor known at present, defined as CRF-1, CRF-2a, CRF-2b, and CRF-2g. Three of these receptors are expressed only in the brain: CRF-1 in the cortex and cerebrum, CRF-2a in the lateral septum and hypothalamus, and CRF-2g in the amygdala. CRF-2b is expressed in the choroid plexus and cerebral arterioles in the brain, but is expressed mainly peripherally on the heart and skeletal muscle tissue. Extensive research has shown that overactivity in the brain CRF-CRF1 signaling system contributes to the onset of anxiety disorders and depression. It's been hypothesized that patients with clinical conditions that are causally related to HPA hyperactivity, including major depression and post-traumatic stress disorders, may benefit from CRH receptor antagonist treatment. CRH antagonists are believed to work by blocking the consequent secretions of ACTH and cortisol that occur following activation of CRH and lowering the stress-induced rise of CRH in CSF. There is increased clinical interest in CRH receptor antagonists that can cross the blood-brain barrier for the treatment of depression and anxiety, along with other conditions related to HPA hyperactivity, including treatment of irritable bowel syndrome, which is exacerbated by stress.

== CRH receptor antagonists research ==
Peptide-based synthetic CRH receptor antagonists have been researched, but as they cannot pass through the blood-brain barrier, clinical research applications seem unlikely at this point, while non-peptidic selective CRH-R1 receptor antagonists have been both researched and synthesized with moderate levels of success. The majority of these antagonists consist of a general pharmacophore that is consistent in most research experiments, with minor alterations. The main research into clinical CRF antagonists has focused on antagonists selective for the CRF-1 subtype, which is expressed in the cortex and cerebrum, due to its heightened role in HPA hyperactivity. Several antagonists for this receptor have been developed and are widely used in research, with the best-known agents being the selective CRF-1 antagonist antalarmin and a newer drug pexacerfont. A recent human trial disappointingly found that pexacerfont did no better than a placebo in alleviating the symptoms of generalized anxiety disorder, though additional research is still needed. In monkeys, antalarmin has been successful in lowering the stress-induced CRF rise in CSF, suppressing anxiety-associated behaviors, and increased exploratory behavior in a stressful situation, but human trials are necessary to comprehend the clinical efficacy of antalarmin. Other ligands for the CRF-1 receptor antagonist used in research include LWH-234, CP-154,526, NBI-27914 and R-121,919. A small human clinical trial showed that 30 days of treatment with CRF1 antagonist R-121,919 was effective in lowering depression and anxiety scores in both male and female patients who had suffered a major depressive episode, with no adverse side effects. Antagonists acting at CRF-2 have also been developed, such as the peptide Astressin-B, but so far no highly selective agents for CRF-2 subtypes are available. There is an increased interest in research on the combinational treatment of CRF-1 and CRF-2 antagonists, along with concurrent SSRI treatment, for the treatment of anxiety disorders.

== Other CRH receptor antagonist clinical applications ==
CRH receptor antagonists also have other possible clinical applications aside from the traditional concept of treating depression and anxiety. CRH receptor antagonists could potentially be used as co-treatments with retinol and flavonoids in order to alleviate the symptoms of chronic inflammatory skin diseases like psoriasis and atopic dermatitis, which are often further exacerbated by HPA activation due to stress. There is also hope that CRH receptor antagonists could be useful in the treatment of a range of clinical disorders associated with abnormal stress responses, such as psychosocial growth retardation, euthyroid sick syndrome, stress-induced asthma, and psychogenic impotence. Further research on CRH-1 and CRH-2 receptor antagonists, as well as the mechanisms behind them, needs to be completed before further clinical aspirations can be properly considered.

== See also ==
- PT-00114
