= Corticotropin-releasing hormone receptor 1 =

Protein and coding gene in humans

CRHR1
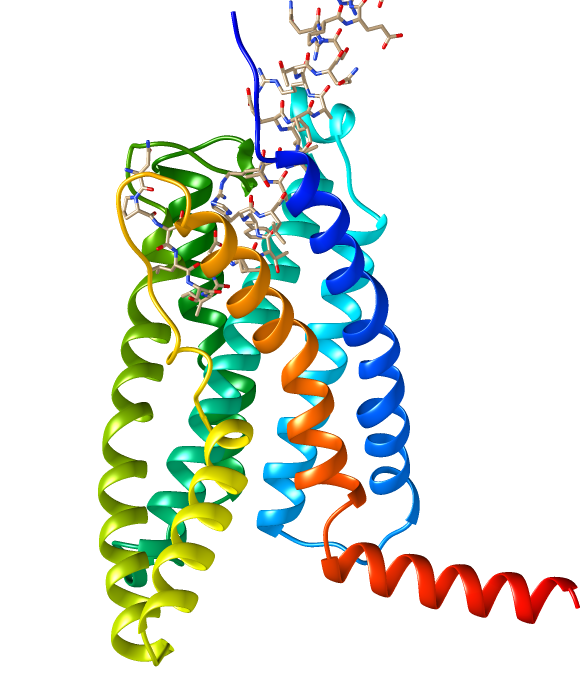

Identifiers
- Aliases: CRHR1, CRF-R, CRF-R-1, CRF-R1, CRF1, CRFR-1, CRFR1, CRH-R-1, CRH-R1, CRH-R1h, CRHR, CRHR1L, CRHR1f, corticotropin releasing hormone receptor 1
- External IDs: OMIM: 122561; MGI: 88498; GeneCards: CRHR1
Available structures
PDB	Ortholog search: PDBe RCSB
PDB	List of PDB id codes 4K5Y, 3EHU, 2L27, 3EHS, 3EHT, 4Z9G

Gene location (Mouse)
Chr.	Chromosome 11 (mouse)
Band	11 E1|11 67.77 cM	Start	104,023,681 bp
Band	11 E1|11 67.77 cM	End	104,066,349 bp
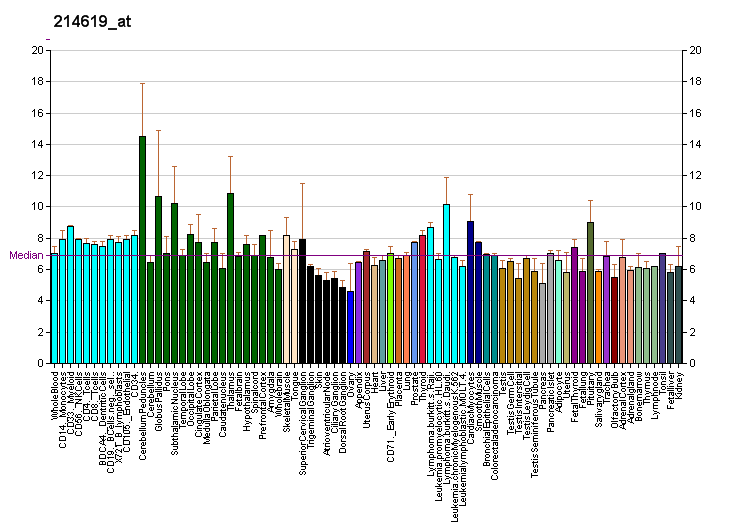

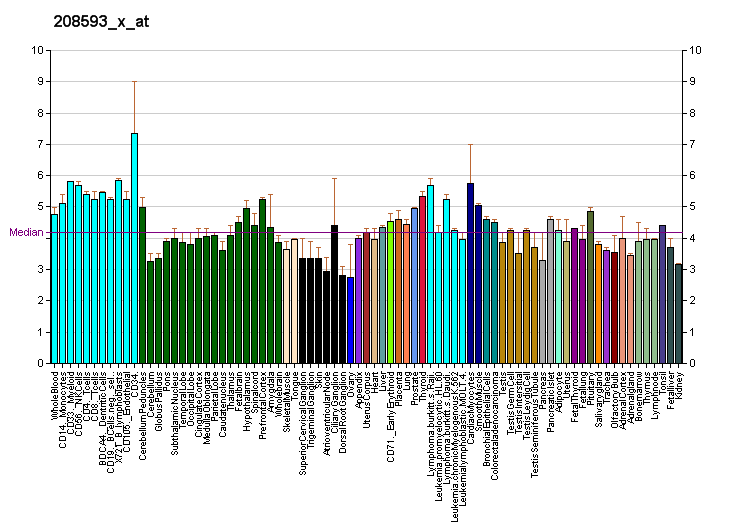

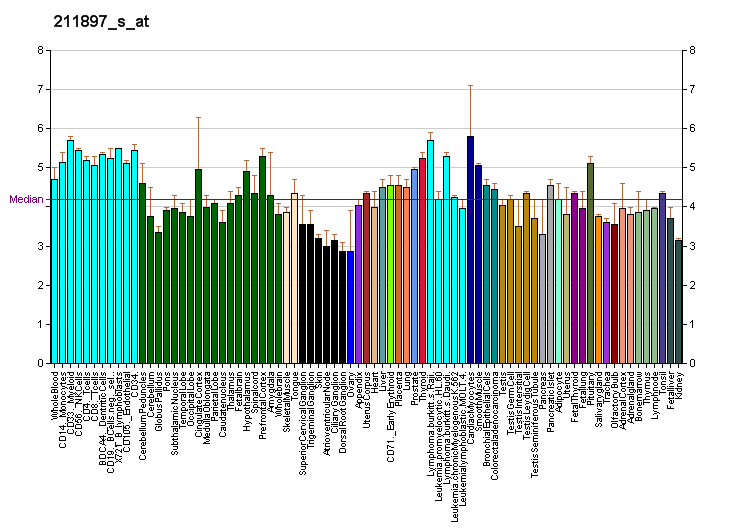
RNA expression pattern
Bgee	Human / Mouse (ortholog); Top expressed in: anterior pituitary; superior frontal gyrus; Brodmann area 9; prefrontal cortex; temporal lobe; amygdala; hippocampus proper; hypothalamus; ganglionic eminence; canal of the cervix / Top expressed in: cerebellar cortex; lumbar subsegment of spinal cord; pontine nuclei; visual cortex; primary visual cortex; cerebellar vermis; lobe of cerebellum; superior frontal gyrus; barrel cortex; cingulate gyrus; More reference expression data
BioGPS	More reference expression data
Gene ontology
Molecular function	G protein-coupled receptor activity; signal transducer activity; protein binding; corticotrophin-releasing factor receptor activity; transmembrane signaling receptor activity; peptide hormone binding; corticotropin-releasing hormone receptor activity; corticotropin-releasing hormone binding; G-protein alpha-subunit binding; peptide binding; protein-containing complex binding
Cellular component	integral component of membrane; endosome; membrane; intrinsic component of plasma membrane; plasma membrane; integral component of plasma membrane; multivesicular body; trans-Golgi network; dendrite; vesicle; soma; apical part of cell
Biological process	corticotropin secretion; female pregnancy; activation of adenylate cyclase activity; regulation of adenylate cyclase activity involved in G protein-coupled receptor signaling pathway; cell surface receptor signaling pathway; birth; immune response; cellular response to corticotropin-releasing hormone stimulus; regulation of corticosterone secretion; negative regulation of voltage-gated calcium channel activity; signal transduction; G protein-coupled receptor signaling pathway; adenylate cyclase-activating G protein-coupled receptor signaling pathway; hormone-mediated signaling pathway; response to hypoxia; adenylate cyclase-modulating G protein-coupled receptor signaling pathway; phospholipase C-activating G protein-coupled receptor signaling pathway; positive regulation of cytosolic calcium ion concentration; neuropeptide signaling pathway; memory; feeding behavior; visual learning; hypothalamus development; adrenal gland development; epithelial cell differentiation; negative regulation of epinephrine secretion; locomotory exploration behavior; response to immobilization stress; fear response; positive regulation of mast cell degranulation; positive regulation of cAMP-mediated signaling; behavioral response to cocaine; behavioral response to ethanol; regulation of synaptic plasticity; behavioral response to pain; response to electrical stimulus; general adaptation syndrome, behavioral process; long-term potentiation; negative regulation of neuron death; negative regulation of feeding behavior
Sources:Amigo / QuickGO
Orthologs
Databases	NCBI: entry
Species	Human	Mouse
Entrez	1394	12921
Ensembl	n/a	ENSMUSG00000018634
UniProt	P34998	P35347
RefSeq (mRNA)	NM_001145146; NM_001145147; NM_001145148; NM_004382; NM_001303018 NM_001303020	NM_007762; NM_001313928; NM_001313929
RefSeq (protein)	NP_001138618; NP_001138619; NP_001138620; NP_001289947; NP_001289949 NP_004373	NP_001300857; NP_001300858; NP_031788
Location (UCSC)	n/a	Chr 11: 104.02 – 104.07 Mb
PubMed search
- Wikidata
View/Edit Human	View/Edit Mouse

Corticotropin-releasing hormone receptor 1 (CRHR1) is a protein, also known as CRF_{1}, with the latter (CRF_{1}) now being the IUPHAR-recommended name. In humans, CRF_{1} is encoded by the CRHR1 gene at region 17q21.31, beside micrototubule-associated protein tau MAPT.

== Structure ==
The human CRHR1 gene contains 14 exons over 20 kb of DNA, and its full gene product is a peptide composed of 444 amino acids. Excision of exon 6 yields in the mRNA for the primary functional CRF_{1}, which is a peptide composed of 415 amino acids, arranged in seven hydrophobic alpha-helices.

The CRHR1 gene is alternatively spliced into a series of variants. These variants are generated through deletion of one of the 14 exons, which in some cases causes a frame-shift in the open reading frame, and encode corresponding isoforms of CRF_{1}. Though these isoforms have not been identified in native tissues, the mutations of the splice variants of mRNA suggest the existence of alternate CRF receptors, with differences in intracellular loops or deletions in N-terminus or transmembrane domains. Such structural changes suggest that the alternate CRF_{1} receptors have different degrees of capacity and efficiency in binding CRF and its agonists. Though the functions of these CRF_{1} receptors is yet unknown, they are suspected to be biologically significant.

CRF_{1} is 70% homologous with the second human CRF receptor family, CRF_{2}; the greatest divergence between the two lies at the N-terminus of the protein.

== Mechanism of activation ==
CRF_{1} is activated through the binding of CRF or a CRF-agonist. The ligand binding and subsequent receptor conformational change depends on three different sites in the second and third extracellular domains of CRF_{1}.

In the majority of tissues, CRF_{1} is coupled to a stimulatory G-protein that activates the adenylyl cyclase signaling pathway, and ligand-binding triggers an increase in cAMP levels. However, the signal can be transmitted along multiple signal transduction cascades, according to the structure of the receptor and the region of its expression. Alternate signaling pathways activated by CRF_{1} include PKC and MAPK. This wide variety of cascades suggests that CRF_{1} mediates tissue-specific responses to CRF and CRF-agonists.

== Tissue distribution ==
CRF_{1} is expressed widely throughout both the central and peripheral nervous systems. In the central nervous system, CRF_{1} is particularly found in the cortex, cerebellum, amygdala, hippocampus, olfactory bulb, ventral tegmental area, brainstem areas, paraventricular hypothalamus, and pituitary. In the pituitary, CRF_{1} stimulation triggers the activation of the POMC gene, which in turn causes the release of ACTH and β-endorphins from the anterior pituitary. In the peripheral nervous system, CRF_{1} is expressed at low levels in a wide variety of tissues, including the skin, spleen, heart, liver, adipose tissue, placenta, ovary, testis, and adrenal gland.

In CRF_{1} knockout mice, and mice treated with a CRF_{1} antagonist, there is a decrease in anxious behavior and a blunted stress response, suggesting that CRF_{1} mechanisms are anxiogenic. However, the effect of CRF_{1} appears to be regionally specific and cell-type specific, likely due to the wide variety of cascades and signaling pathways activated by the binding of CRF or CRF-agonists. In mice, offspring born to CRF_{1} -/- knockout mothers typically die within a few days of birth from lung dysplasia, likely due to low glucocorticoid levels. In the central nervous system, CRF_{1} activation mediates fear learning and consolidation in the extended amygdala, stress-related modulation of memory formation in the hippocampus, and brainstem regulation of arousal.

== Function ==
The corticotropin-releasing hormone receptor binds corticotropin-releasing hormone, a potent mediator of endocrine, autonomic, behavioral, and immune responses to stress.

CRF1 receptors in mice mediate ethanol enhancement of GABAergic synaptic transmission.

== Postpartum function ==
Postpartum CRF_{1} knockout mice spend less time nursing and less time licking and grooming their offspring than their wildtype counterparts during the first few days postpartum. These pups weighed less as a result. This pattern of maternal behavior indicates that CRF_{1} may be needed for early postpartum mothers to display typical mothering behaviors. Maternal aggression is attenuated by increases in CRF and urocortin 2, which bind to CRF_{1}.

== Evolution ==
Corticotrophin releasing hormone (CRH) evolved ~500 million years ago in an organism that subsequently gave rise to both chordates and arthropods. The binding site for this was single CRH like receptor. In vertebrates this gene was duplicated leading to the extant CRH1 and CRH2 forms. Additionally four paralogous ligands developed including CRH, urotensin-1/urocortin, urocortin II and urocortin III.

== Clinical significance ==
Variations in the CRHR1 gene is associated with enhanced response to inhaled corticosteroid therapy in asthma.

CRF1 triggers cells to release hormones that are linked to stress and anxiety [original reference missing]. Hence CRF1 receptor antagonists are being actively studied as possible treatments for depression and anxiety.

Variations in CRHR1 are associated with persistent pulmonary hypertension of the newborn.

== Interactions ==
Corticotropin-releasing hormone receptor 1 has been shown to interact with Corticotropin-releasing hormone and urocortin.

== See also ==
- Corticotropin-releasing hormone
- Corticotropin-releasing hormone receptor
- Corticotropin-releasing hormone antagonist
- Antalarmin
- Pexacerfont
- Verucerfont
