= Corticotropin-releasing hormone receptor =

G protein-coupled receptor family

corticotropin releasing hormone receptor 1
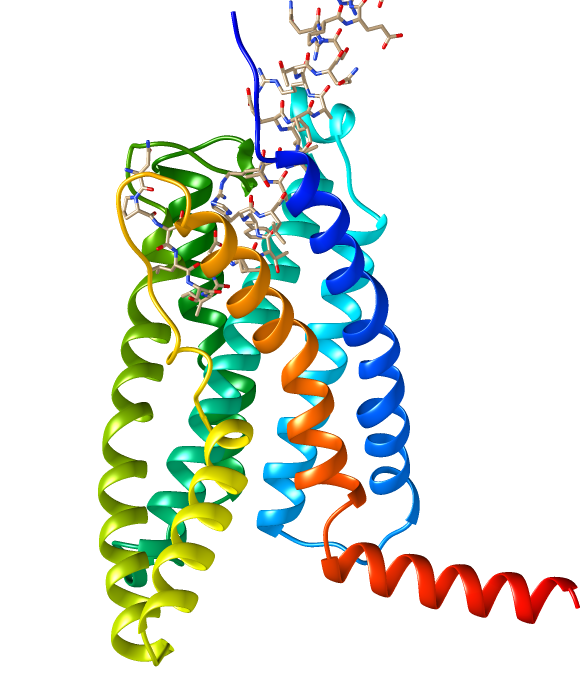
- Image of Corticotropin-releasing hormone 1

Identifiers
- Symbol: CRHR1
- Alt. symbols: CRHR
- NCBI gene: 1394
- HGNC: 2357
- OMIM: 122561
- RefSeq: XM_001128344
- UniProt: P34998

Other data
- Locus: Chr. 17 q12-q22
Search for
- Structures: Swiss-model
- Domains: InterPro

corticotropin releasing hormone receptor 2

Identifiers
- Symbol: CRHR2
- NCBI gene: 1395
- HGNC: 2358
- OMIM: 602034
- RefSeq: NM_001883
- UniProt: Q13324

Other data
- Locus: Chr. 7 p21-p15
Search for
- Structures: Swiss-model
- Domains: InterPro

Corticotropin-releasing hormone receptors (CRHRs), also known as corticotropin-releasing factor receptors (CRFRs), are a family of G protein-coupled receptors that bind corticotropin-releasing hormone (CRH). There are two main subtypes in this receptor family, designated as type 1 and type 2, each encoded by a distinct gene—CRHR1 and CRHR2, respectively.

These receptors play a central role in regulating the hypothalamic-pituitary-adrenal (HPA) axis, a complex system that controls the release of stress-related hormones such as cortisol. The CRHR-mediated stress response is crucial for maintaining homeostasis, or physiological equilibrium. However, dysregulation of this system has been linked to several mental health disorders, including anxiety, depression, and post-traumatic stress disorder (PTSD).

Corticotropin-releasing hormone receptors are classified into two subtypes: CRHR1 and CRHR2. CRHR1 is primarily involved in initiating the stress response, whereas CRHR2 appears to modulate both the initiation and resolution of that response. Understanding how these receptors function within the HPA axis—and how their activity is influenced by genetic and environmental factors—is essential for developing treatments for stress-related disorders.

== Function ==
The hypothalamic-pituitary-adrenal (HPA) axis is a central neuroendocrine system that modulates the body's response to stress. It governs the release of hormones that prepare the body for immediate action—the "fight or flight" response—and subsequently restore physiological balance. At the core of this system is the release of corticotropin-releasing hormone (CRH) from the hypothalamus, which binds to corticotropin-releasing hormone receptors (CRHRs) in the anterior pituitary gland. This interaction stimulates the secretion of adrenocorticotropic hormone (ACTH), which acts on the adrenal glands to release cortisol.

Cortisol increases blood glucose levels, improves cardiovascular output, and suppresses non-essential functions such as digestion and reproduction, enabling the body to respond effectively to stress. However, chronic elevation of cortisol may contribute to immune suppression, obesity, and cardiovascular disease.

== Signaling and feedback regulation ==
=== Receptor activation ===
CRH binds to two receptor subtypes—CRHR1 and CRHR2—which are G protein-coupled receptors (GPCRs) that activate different intracellular signaling pathways depending on ligand, tissue, and context. CRHR1 generally couples with Gα_{s} proteins, triggering adenylyl cyclase, cAMP production, and activation of protein kinase A (PKA).

CRHR2 also couples with G proteins but preferentially activates pathways involving phospholipase C, leading to hydrolysis of PIP_{2} into IP3 and DAG, which mobilize calcium and activate protein kinase C (PKC), respectively.

=== Feedback mechanisms ===
The HPA axis uses negative feedback to regulate hormone levels. Elevated cortisol suppresses CRH and ACTH production, ensuring return to homeostasis. Disruption of this loop can lead to sustained cortisol elevation, contributing to psychiatric disorders and metabolic diseases.

== Stress response ==
=== CRHR1: initiation ===
CRHR1 is highly expressed in stress-responsive brain regions such as the hypothalamus, amygdala, and hippocampus. Upon activation by CRH, it triggers ACTH release through hypothalamic-pituitary-adrenal (HPA) axis activation and initiates the physiological stress response. CRHR1 activation enhances neuronal excitability in the hippocampus by modulating potassium channels (K_{V}1 subfamily), increasing population spike amplitudes through presynaptic mechanisms.

In the amygdala, CRHR1 enhances fear and anxiety through G_{s}α-coupled signaling pathways that increase cAMP production and CREB phosphorylation. Hippocampal CRHR1 activation impairs memory and learning by reducing long-term potentiation through calcineurin-mediated suppression of potassium currents (I_{A} and I_{K}).

Dysregulation of CRHR1 contributes to anxiety, depression, PTSD, and cognitive impairment. Chronic CRHR1 activation leads to HPA axis hyperactivity and reduced hippocampal neurogenesis. Genetic studies show specific CRHR1 variants (rs12938031, rs4792887) increase PTSD risk after trauma exposure through impaired cortisol feedback. Preclinical models demonstrate CRHR1 antagonists reverse stress-induced dendritic atrophy in prefrontal cortex pyramidal neurons.

=== CRHR2: termination ===
CRHR2 expression is more restricted but includes the ventromedial hypothalamus, bed nucleus of stria terminalis, and peripheral tissues. It serves to attenuate the stress response through urocortin 3 binding, which activates G_{q}-coupled pathways that suppress CRH release and enhance negative feedback. CRHR2 activation increases brain-derived neurotrophic factor (BDNF) expression in the ventral tegmental area, promoting stress resilience.

CRHR2 dysfunction impairs HPA axis recovery, contributing to prolonged stress responses and emotional dysregulation. Knockout models show 40% increased anxiety-like behaviors in elevated plus maze tests and delayed cortisol normalization after restraint stress. Human studies link CRHR2 polymorphisms to altered startle response habituation and impaired fear extinction in PTSD patients. The receptor's peripheral effects include modulation of cardiovascular tone through ERK1/2-dependent pathways in vascular smooth muscle cells.

== Mechanisms of signaling ==
Both CRHR1 and CRHR2 activate intracellular cascades involving cAMP/PKA or IP3/DAG signaling. These influence gene expression, including activation of CREB, a transcription factor that upregulates genes related to plasticity, stress response, and immunity. Sustained CRHR activation can create a feedback loop of increased CRH expression, contributing to receptor desensitization and maladaptive stress responses.

== Genetic variants and stress susceptibility ==
Polymorphisms in CRHR1 and CRHR2 genes influence receptor function and stress vulnerability. CRHR1 SNPs have been linked to increased risk of anxiety and depression, especially in individuals exposed to early-life stress.

Variants in CRHR2 are associated with better stress recovery and reduced PTSD risk, likely due to improved feedback regulation of cortisol.

== Clinical relevance and therapeutics ==
=== CRHR1 antagonists ===
Antagonists targeting CRHR1 have shown promise in reducing anxiety, depression, and PTSD symptoms by limiting cortisol release and dampening stress-related signaling. For example, Verucerfont (GSK561679), a selective CRHR1 antagonist, has been evaluated of treating PTSD symptoms in a Phase II randomized controlled trial involving women with chronic PTSD. The CRHR1 antagonist antalarmin has been shown in animal studies to protect against stress-induced colonic injury by reducing NF-κB-mediated inflammation and stabilizing gut microbiota.

NBI30775 (R121919), which reversed synaptic loss in hippocampal CA1/CA3 regions and rescued trauma-induced memory deficits in aged mice. Mechanistically, CRHR1 antagonists suppress Gαs-cAMP-PKA signaling cascades, normalizing HPA axis hyperactivity and dendritic atrophy in prefrontal cortex neurons.

=== CRHR2 modulators ===
Drugs targeting CRHR2 aim to enhance feedback mechanisms and restore balance in the HPA axis. The orally bioavailable CRHR2 antagonist RQ-00490721 attenuated pressure overload-induced cardiac dysfunction in mice by suppressing CREB/AKT phosphorylation pathways, highlighting its potential for heart failure treatment. CRHR2 activation via urocortin 2 promotes stress resilience by increasing BDNF expression in the ventral tegmental area and facilitating fear extinction.

Genetic studies reveal that CRHR2 knockout models exhibit increased anxiety-like behaviors and impaired cortisol normalization post-stress. Emerging modulators aim to exploit CRHR2's role in peripheral tissues-for example, its ERK1/2-dependent regulation of vascular smooth muscle tone-to address stress-related cardiovascular comorbidities.
