= Urocortin II =

Endogenous peptide in the corticotrophin-releasing factor (CRF) family

Identifiers
- Aliases
- External IDs: GeneCards: ; OMA:- orthologs
Orthologs
Species	Human	Mouse
Entrez	n/a	n/a
Ensembl	n/a	n/a
UniProt	n a	n/a
RefSeq (mRNA)	n/a	n/a
RefSeq (protein)	n/a	n/a
Location (UCSC)	n/a	n/a
PubMed search	n/a	n/a
- Wikidata
View/Edit Human

Urocortin 2 (Ucn2) is an endogenous peptide in the corticotrophin-releasing factor (CRF) family.

Urocortin II is a 38-amino acid peptide that is a member of the CRF family of peptides. Unlike Urocortin I, Urocortin II is highly selective for the CRF2 receptor and does not show affinity for the CRF binding protein.

== Function ==
Urocortin (UCN) II, also known as stresscopin-related peptide, is a 38 amino acid member of the mammalian corticotropin-releasing hormone (CRH) peptide family, which also includes CRH, UCN I, and UCN III. CRH mainly binds to type 1 CRH receptors (CRH1), while UCN II and III bind primarily to type 2 CRH receptors, and UCN I binds to both (CRH2). Each of these hormones has distinctive distribution patterns in the central nervous system and the periphery, suggesting each peptide may have distinct behavioral and physiological effects, although all have been associated with anxiety. In general, agonism of CRH1 receptors is posited to be anxiogenic and agonism of CRH2 receptors is posited to be anxiolytic.

Urocortin II has been shown to have anorexigenic effects and hypotensive effects similar to Urocortin, but does not induce secretion of ACTH.

=== Receptor ===
The activation of cAMP/PKA by Ucn2 gives similar effects to the β-adrenergic pathway. Ucn2 increases left ventricular function independent of the β-adrenergic receptor but dependent on the binding of Ucn2 to CFR2. Ucn2 is an agonist for the G-protein coupled CRF1 and CRF2 receptors. It is highly selective for CRF2 which is predominantly found in the myocardium, blood vessels and peripheral tissues. This association provides reason for its strong cardiovascular effects. When Ucn2 binds CRF2 it activates adenyl-cyclase to increase cAMP which activates PKA and results in the noted changes to cardiovascular function.

The ability of Ucn2 to produce PKA and alter calcium flux has led to the hypothesis that administration of Ucn2 may increase the risk of arrhythmias.

== Clinical significance ==
Immunohistochemistry analysis of human myocytes has shown greater immunoreactivity of Ucn2 in myocytes of the failing heart compared to those of the healthy heart. This is a result of an innate mechanism in which Ucn2 acts to improve function of the failing heart. The pathophysiology of heart failure is often a consequence of improper calcium handling and relaxation resulting in a lower cardiac output, decreased blood flow and overall decreased heart function. Infusion of Ucn2 in healthy humans has shown a dose dependent increase in cardiac output, heart rate and left ventricle ejection fraction and a decrease in systemic vascular resistance. Ucn2 has been studied as potential treatment for individuals with heart failure.

== Animal studies ==
Infusion of Ucn2 into rat hearts resulted in an immediate and significant improvement in left ventricle function, increased coronary flow, significantly altered intracellular calcium handling and increased SR calcium. These relaxation effects can be explained by the increased calcium clearance into the SR would assist in relaxation of the cell. Increased calcium in the SR by Ucn2 is a result of Ucn2 mediated production of cAMP and phosphokinase A (PKA). Ucn2 increases cAMP levels in myocytes and nonmyocytes. The production of PKA results in the phosphorylation of phospholamban and inhibition of its block on the sarcoendoplasmic reticulum calcium ATPase (SERCA). In rat coronary vessels, PKA mediates inhibition of calcium-independent phospholipase A and calcium influx which results in relaxation of the vasculature. This suggests Ucn2 may be beneficial in improving blood but these findings have less biological applicability to human medicine as they were completed on rats. In 2011 a similar relationship was found in human heart. Ucn2 produced a dose dependent relaxation of coronary. This correlation was a result of the cAMP/ PKA pathway and independent of endothelial function. Ucn2 may be a beneficial drug in damaged hearts where the endothelium is not intact.
