= Cholinergic neuron =

Type of nerve cell

A cholinergic neuron is a nerve cell which mainly uses the neurotransmitter acetylcholine (ACh) to send its messages. Many neurological systems are cholinergic. Cholinergic neurons provide the primary source of acetylcholine to the cerebral cortex, and promote cortical activation during both wakefulness and rapid eye movement sleep. The cholinergic system of neurons has been a main focus of research in aging and neural degradation, specifically as it relates to Alzheimer's disease. The dysfunction and loss of basal forebrain cholinergic neurons and their cortical projections are among the earliest pathological events in Alzheimer's disease.

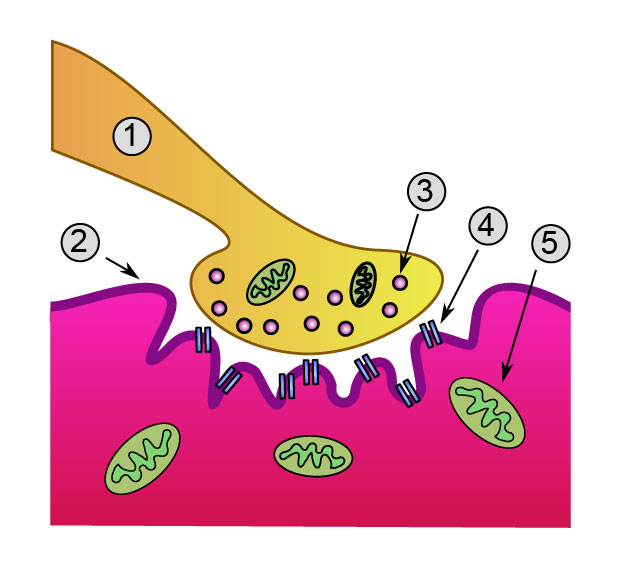
Neuromuscular junction using acetylcholine as the neurotransmitter

== Anatomy ==
Most research involving cholinergic neurons involves the basal forebrain cholinergic neurons. However, cholinergic neurons only represent about 5% of the total basal forebrain cell population. Most of these neurons originate in different areas of the basal forebrain and have extensive projections into almost all layers of the cortex. Basal forebrain cholinergic neurons are homologous within a particular basal forebrain region but vary across different regions. In the brainstem acetylcholine originates from the pedunculopontine nucleus and laterodorsal tegmental nucleus collectively known as the meso-pontine tegmental area or pontomesencephalotegmental complex.

== Normal aging ==
Normal aging is described as aging unaccompanied by the behavioral or cognitive dysfunctions associated with the cholinergic basal forebrain system. In normal aging, there are beadlike swellings within the cholinergic fibers with enlarged or thickened axons, often in grape-like clusters. This fiber swelling can be induced in a laboratory setting by damaging the cell body of the cholinergic neuron, which implies there is a slow cell and fiber degeneration of affected neurons and their projecting axons.

== Neuroprotective effects ==
Nerve growth factor protects cholinergic neurons. The small non-toxic molecule urea has no neuroprotective effect on cholinergic neurons by itself, but when experimental brain slices were treated with nerve growth factor and urea, the number of cholinergic neurons in the brain slices was significantly enhanced when compared to slices treated with nerve growth factor only. The enhancing effect of urea may be due to inhibition of the nitric oxide-system within the cholinergic neuron.

== Relationship to mammalian circadian system ==
Cholinergic neurons, along with non-cholinergic neurons, have sleep/wake regulatory functions in the basal forebrain that can be categorized based on their firing patterns in different regions. The cholinergic system allows the circadian system to have the cycle of one day. The cholinergic neuron may also play a role in time memory, and the ability of an individual to form a memory around a certain time of day, which is known as "time stamping". The cholinergic system is characterized by high acetylcholine release during the active phase of an individual’s circadian rhythm.

=== Firing patterns and the circadian system ===
In the medial septum-diagonal band of Broca's area of the brain, cholinergic neurons have very low firing rates during both wake and non-REM sleep, and show no rhythmic bursts during hippocampal (theta) Electroencephalography activity. However, cholinergic neurons in the magnocellular preoptic nucleus and Substantia innominata have increased firing rates with fast cortical (gamma) Electroencephalography activity during wake and rapid eye movement sleep. This indicates that cholinergic neurons may be activated through α_{1}-receptors by noradrenaline, which were released by locus coeruleus neurons during wake cycles. In a basic summary, cholinergic neurons are always active during wake or rapid eye movement sleep cycles, and are more likely to activate the cerebral cortex to induce the gamma wave and Theta rhythm activities while behaviorally promoting the states of wakefulness and rapid eye movement sleep.

=== Time memory and time stamping ===
The suprachiasmatic nucleus functions as the hypothalamic master clock, controlling the body's Circadian rhythm. The suprachiasmatic nucleus of mice, hamsters, and rats have a small amount of cholinergic innervation. A "time memory" is the memory at a specific time of day for which an individual made an association with a certain event or location. "Time stamping" is the process by which the specific time-of-day is encoded to support the formation of a time memory. The situation must be important and specific, without unnecessary prolonging, for a time stamp to occur. Acetylcholine excites cells in the suprachiasmatic nucleus, so cholinergic transmission of more Acetylcholine into the suprachiasmatic nucleus should support the formation of a time memory.

The number of free and available muscarinic acetylcholine receptors (mAChRs) is highest when acetylcholine release is at the lowest levels. When a memorable event occurs, there is a massive release of acetylcholine that will attach to mAChRs. Once too many are involved, the mAChRs will reduce or block further cholinergic input, which protects these cells and the networks from additional cholinergic input that could disrupt the signal. This allows the suprachiasmatic nucleus to perform time stamping and produce a time memory of what has just occurred to the individual. If correct, this would explain the cholinergic neuron’s role in memory.

=== Circadian system and Alzheimer's disease ===
The circadian system is one of the first systems to be damaged in Alzheimer's disease. Alzheimer's patients often complain of disrupted sleep, shortened rapid eye movement sleep, and increased night time awakening. These disruptions steadily worsen as the disease progresses. It is normal in aging for circadian rhythms to deteriorate as choline acetyltransferase (ChAT) fluctuations change in pattern and acetylcholine levels fluctuate more often. As Alzheimer's disease drastically changes cholinergic function, the circadian system naturally follows the changed levels. Circadian rhythmicity in acetylcholine release is critical for optimal memory processing, and a loss of this rhythmicity contributes to cognitive problems in Alzheimer's disease.

=== Olfactory behavior ===
Circadian modulation of cholinergic neuronal could be important for mediating sexual behaviors in mice. Modifications of basal forebrain cholinergic neuronal activity disrupted odor discrimination of simple odors, and the investigation of social odors.

== Neurological disorders ==
Degeneration of the cholinergic neurons in the basal forebrain has been linked to progressing memory deficits related to aging, which eventually results in decreased cholinergic function. The dysfunction and loss of basal forebrain cholinergic neurons has been observed in many dementias, especially Alzheimer's. Recent findings imply that aging-related cognitive deficits are due to impairments of cholinergic function rather than cholinergic cell loss. This suggests that it will be possible to reverse cognitive declines, as the cells are not dead, but deteriorating.

=== Alzheimer's disease ===
Alzheimer's disease is the most common form of dementia, and the sixth leading cause of death in the United States. The proportion of deaths associated with Alzheimer's continues to grow rapidly, increasing by 66% from 2000 to 2008. Alzheimer's typically involves a decline in the activity of choline acetyltransferase and acetylcholinesterase, as well as a decline in acetylcholine release. Cholinergic system research may provide the key to treating and reversing this devastating disease.

==== Histological hallmarks ====
Although degeneration of basal forebrain cholinergic cells has been observed in many other dementias, Alzheimer's has two distinctive histological hallmarks: Beta amyloid plaques and neurofibrillary tangles. The Beta amyloid plaques are high-molecular weight fibrils and are major components of the senile Alzheimer's disease brain. There appears to be a vast, intrinsic microvascular pathology of the brain in these cases, which suggests a link between Beta amyloid production, impairments in cerebrovascular function, and basal forebrain cholinergic deficits in AD. It appears that Beta amyloid (1-42) mediates its cytotoxic action by affecting key proteins that play a role in apoptosis induction. There is also evidence that shows beta amyloid proteins actually bind to cholinergic neurons and physically inhibit ChAT activity in cultures treated with oligomers of beta amyloid. The other histological hallmarks, neurofibrillary tangles, are the intracellular inclusions formed by aggregates of hyperphosphorylated tau protein. This is found only in select populations of patients with Alzheimer's. This tau protein has specific pathology, and has been found both in patients with mild cognitive impairment (a forerunner of Alzheimer's) and Alzheimer's itself. The neurofibrillary tangles seem to increase within the basal forebrain cholinergic complex with old age and at a more accelerated pace in patients with Alzheimer's.

==== Probable cause for vulnerable cholinergic neurons ====
The "cholinergic hypothesis" is a well-established pathology of the involvement of cholinergic neurons on Alzheimer's disease due to their role in memory. Research in 2007 determined why cholinergic neurons were becoming more vulnerable to Beta amyloid plaque formation. A pathway exists for both the maturation and degradation of Nerve Growth Factor, which causes cholinergic neurons to become vulnerable. Basal forebrain cholinergic neurons are highly dependent on the constant internal supply of Nerve Growth Factor throughout life. If the supply of Nerve Growth Factor is interrupted, cholinergic atrophy could begin to occur in these neurons and change their phenotype. This supply could be interrupted if there is a failure in the protease cascade and the precursor proNGF cannot be converted to Nerve Growth Factor. This is caused by a rise in matrix metalloproteinase-9 activity, which increases the degradation of Nerve Growth Factor and reduces its production. This double failure of Nerve Growth Factor stimulation leads to the progressive atrophy of basal forebrain cholinergic neurons, which in turn contributes to Alzheimer's-related learning and memory declines.

==== Disease model ====
Most studies of Alzheimer's have used mice or rat brains with Beta amyloid plaque buildup as the disease model. In 2013, Dr. Su-Chun Zhang and his research team derived cholinergic neurons from neuroepithelial stem cells in a laboratory setting, making it easier to test potential treatments without the use of live animals.

==== Potential treatments ====
Potential treatments for Alzheimer's include the use of memantine, a moderate affinity uncompetitive NMDA receptor antagonist that preferentially blocks excessive N-methyl-D-aspartate (NMDA) receptor activity without disrupting normal activity. This treatment is based on the theory that degenerative neural disorders have excitotoxic processes due to the inappropriate overstimulation of the NMDA receptor. In a rat model, memantine treatment given preventatively to certain rats pre-β-amyloid (1-42) lesion significantly reduced the loss of cholinergic fibers. Memantine treatment reversed attention and learning deficits in Beta amyloid (1-42) affected rats. This data indicates the ability of memantine to rescue neocortical cholinergic fibers (originating from basal forebrain cholinergic neurons) from the neurotoxic effects of Beta amyloid (1-42) oligomers. It should also be noted that memantine is able to inhibit the truncation of glycogen synthase kinase-3 (triggered by activated calpain), which is believed to play a key role in the pathogenesis of Alzheimer's, affecting tau phosphorylation (the second histological hallmark).

Another treatment involves the use of exogenous choline acetyltransferase as supplementation in cholinergic neurons. Cholinergic neurons have significantly reduced choline acetyltransferase and acetylcholine activity, which is correlated to the severity of the dementia or cognitive impairments. The problem with this therapy is that choline acetyltransferase is largely blocked by the blood-brain barrier. PTD-ChAT is a fusion protein made up of both protein transduction domain and choline acetyltransferase; it can pass through the blood-brain barrier and cell membranes. It regulates acetylcholine levels in the brain, curing mice treated with PTD-ChAT from their memory and cognitive deficits.

=== Other potential diseases ===
Cholinergic neurons have an effect on other neurodegenerative diseases such as Parkinson's disease, Huntington's disease and Down syndrome. As with Alzheimer's, the degeneration of basal forebrain cholinergic neurons and the decrease in the neurotransmitter acetylcholine have a drastic effect on behavioral and cognitive function.
