= Corticotropin-releasing hormone =

Mammalian protein found in humans

CRH
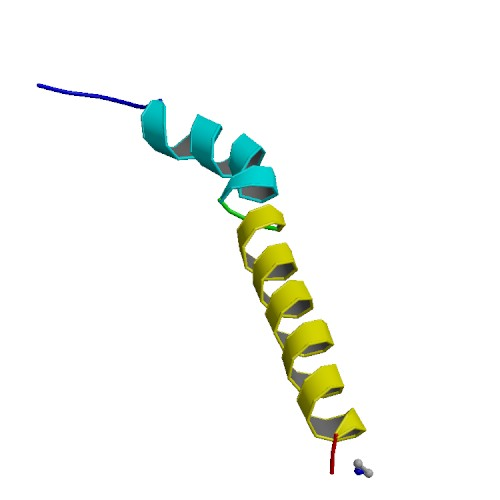

Identifiers
- Aliases: CRH, CRF, CRH1, corticotropin releasing hormone
- External IDs: OMIM: 122560; MGI: 88496; GeneCards: CRH
Available structures
PDB	Ortholog search: PDBe RCSB
PDB	List of PDB id codes 3EHU, 3EHT, 1GOE

Gene location (Human)
Chr.	Chromosome 8 (human)
Band	8q13.1	Start	66,176,376 bp
Band	8q13.1	End	66,178,464 bp

Gene location (Mouse)
Chr.	Chromosome 3 (mouse)
Band	3 A2|3 5.75 cM	Start	19,747,565 bp
Band	3 A2|3 5.75 cM	End	19,749,560 bp
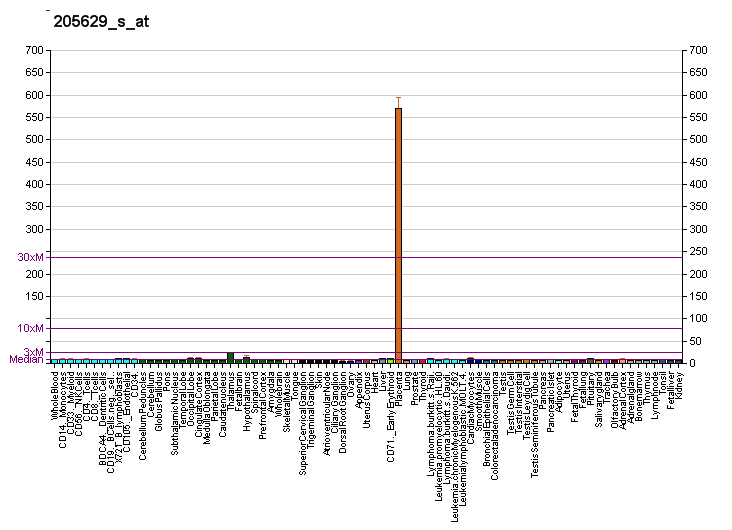

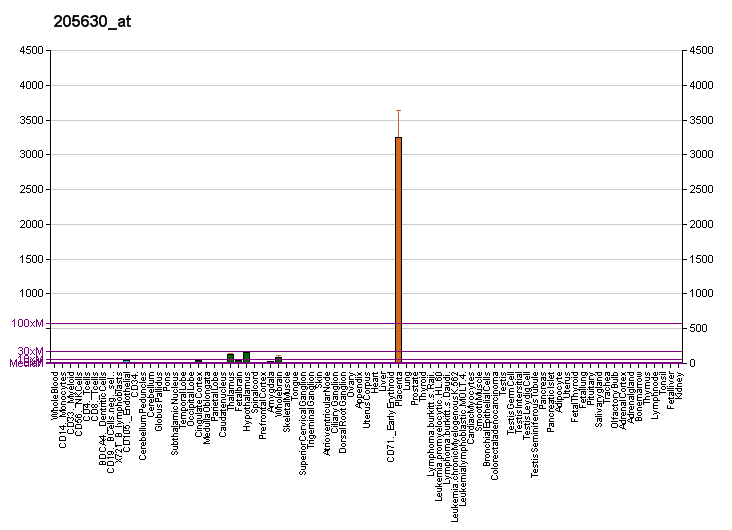
RNA expression pattern
Bgee	Human / Mouse (ortholog); Top expressed in: lateral nuclear group of thalamus; placenta; Brodmann area 46; prefrontal cortex; Brodmann area 10; frontal pole; cingulate gyrus; anterior cingulate cortex; orbitofrontal cortex; dorsolateral prefrontal cortex / Top expressed in: medial vestibular nucleus; olfactory tubercle; central amygdaloid nucleus; paraventricular nucleus of hypothalamus; lateral hypothalamus; medial geniculate nucleus; nucleus accumbens; dorsal tegmental nucleus; piriform cortex; prefrontal cortex; More reference expression data
BioGPS	More reference expression data
Gene ontology
Molecular function	hormone activity; corticotropin-releasing hormone receptor 1 binding; corticotropin-releasing hormone receptor 2 binding; protein binding; neuropeptide hormone activity; signaling receptor binding; corticotropin-releasing hormone activity
Cellular component	cytoplasm; perikaryon; varicosity; extracellular region; soma; extracellular space
Biological process	response to cocaine; response to immobilization stress; positive regulation of cortisol secretion; steroid metabolic process; positive regulation of protein phosphorylation; negative regulation of luteinizing hormone secretion; positive regulation of cell death; associative learning; ion homeostasis; lung development; diterpenoid metabolic process; response to corticosterone; female pregnancy; negative regulation of norepinephrine secretion; adrenal gland development; synaptic transmission, dopaminergic; negative regulation of cell death; negative regulation of gene expression; cellular response to dexamethasone stimulus; positive regulation of corticosterone secretion; response to estrogen; locomotory exploration behavior; regulation of NMDA receptor activity; regulation of serotonin secretion; positive regulation of calcium ion import; glucocorticoid biosynthetic process; positive regulation of gene expression; positive regulation of digestive system process; birth; response to pain; positive regulation of circadian sleep/wake cycle, wakefulness; positive regulation of cell population proliferation; hypothalamus development; learning or memory; hormone-mediated apoptotic signaling pathway; positive regulation of insulin secretion involved in cellular response to glucose stimulus; response to ethanol; inflammatory response; negative regulation of circadian sleep/wake cycle, REM sleep; response to ether; positive regulation of behavioral fear response; signal transduction; cellular response to cocaine; long-term potentiation; chemical synaptic transmission; negative regulation of epinephrine secretion; negative regulation of glucagon secretion; G protein-coupled receptor signaling pathway; negative regulation of systemic arterial blood pressure; positive regulation of cAMP-mediated signaling; positive regulation of corticotropin secretion
Sources:Amigo / QuickGO
Orthologs
Databases	NCBI: entry; OMA: entry
Species	Human	Mouse
Entrez	1392	12918
Ensembl	ENSG00000147571	ENSMUSG00000049796
UniProt	P06850	Q8CIT0
RefSeq (mRNA)	NM_000756	NM_205769
RefSeq (protein)	NP_000747	NP_991338
Location (UCSC)	Chr 8: 66.18 – 66.18 Mb	Chr 3: 19.75 – 19.75 Mb
PubMed search
- Wikidata
View/Edit Human	View/Edit Mouse

Corticotropin-releasing hormone (CRH) (also known as corticotropin-releasing factor (CRF) or corticoliberin; corticotropin may also be spelled corticotrophin) is a peptide hormone involved in stress responses. It is a releasing hormone that belongs to corticotropin-releasing factor family. In humans, it is encoded by the CRH gene. Its main function is the stimulation of the pituitary synthesis of adrenocorticotropic hormone (ACTH), as part of the hypothalamic–pituitary–adrenal axis (HPA axis).

Corticotropin-releasing hormone (CRH) is a 41-amino acid peptide derived from a 196-amino acid preprohormone. CRH is secreted by the paraventricular nucleus (PVN) of the hypothalamus in response to stress. Increased CRH production has been observed to be associated with Alzheimer's disease and major depression, and autosomal recessive hypothalamic corticotropin deficiency has multiple and potentially fatal metabolic consequences including hypoglycemia.

In addition to the hypothalamus, CRH is produced by neurons in other brain regions, including the neocortex, limbic system and brainstem. In the olivocerebellar tract, CRH is expressed in neurons that send their axons from the inferior olivary complex to the cerebellar cortex. CRH is also synthesized in peripheral tissues, such as T lymphocytes, and it is highly expressed in the placenta, where it regulates the length of gestation and the timing of parturition and delivery. A rapid increase in circulating levels of CRH occurs at the onset of parturition, suggesting that, in addition to its metabolic functions, CRH may act as a trigger for parturition.

A recombinant version of CRH for diagnostics is called corticorelin (INN).

== Actions and psychopharmacology ==
CRH is produced in response to stress, predominantly by parvocellular neurosecretory cells within the paraventricular nucleus of the hypothalamus and is released at the median eminence from neurosecretory terminals of these neurons into the primary capillary plexus of the hypothalamo-hypophyseal portal system. The portal system carries the CRH to the anterior lobe of the pituitary, where it stimulates corticotropes to secrete adrenocorticotropic hormone (ACTH) and other biologically-active substances (β-endorphin). ACTH stimulates the synthesis of cortisol, glucocorticoids, mineralocorticoids and DHEA.

In the short term, CRH can suppress appetite, increase subjective feelings of anxiety, and perform other functions like boosting attention.

During chronic stress conditions such as post-traumatic stress disorder (PTSD), blood serum levels of CRH are decreased in combat veterans with PTSD compared to healthy individuals. It is believed that chronic stress enhances the negative feedback inhibition of the HPA axis, resulting in lower CRH levels and HPA function.

Abnormally high levels of CRH have been found in people with major depression, and in the cerebrospinal fluid of people who have committed suicide.

Corticotropin-releasing hormone has been shown to interact with its receptors, corticotropin-releasing hormone receptor 1 (CRFR1) and corticotropin-releasing hormone receptor 2 (CRFR2), in order to induce its effects. Injection of CRH into the rodent paraventricular nucleus of the hypothalamus (PVN) can increase CRFR1 expression, with increased expression leading to depression-like behaviors. Sex differences have also been observed with respect to both CRH and the receptors that it interacts with. CRFR1 has been shown to exist at higher levels in the female nucleus accumbens, olfactory tubercle, and rostral anteroventral periventricular nucleus (AVPV) when compared to males, while male voles show increased levels of CRFR2 in the bed nucleus of the stria terminalis compared to females.

The CRH-1 receptor antagonist pexacerfont is currently under investigation for the treatment of generalized anxiety disorder. Another CRH-1 antagonist antalarmin has been researched in animal studies for the treatment of anxiety, depression and other conditions, but no human trials with this compound have been carried out.

The activation of the CRH1 receptor has been linked with the euphoric feelings that accompany alcohol consumption. A CRH1 receptor antagonist developed by Pfizer, CP-154,526 is under investigation for the potential treatment of alcoholism.

Increased CRH production has been observed to be associated with Alzheimer's disease.

Although one action of CRH is immunosuppression via the action of cortisol, CRH itself can actually heighten the immune system's inflammation response, a process being investigated in multiple sclerosis research.

Autosomal recessive hypothalamic corticotropin deficiency has multiple and potentially fatal metabolic consequences including hypoglycemia.

Alpha-helical CRH-(9–41) acts as a CRH antagonist.

=== Role in parturition ===
CRH is synthesized by the placenta and seems to determine the duration of pregnancy.

Levels rise towards the end of pregnancy just before birth and current theory suggests three roles of CRH in parturition:

- Increases levels of dehydroepiandrosterone (DHEA) directly by action on the fetal adrenal gland, and indirectly via the mother's pituitary gland. DHEA has a role in preparing for and stimulating cervical contractions.
- Increases prostaglandin availability in uteroplacental tissues. Prostaglandins activate cervical contractions.
- Prior to parturition it may have a role inhibiting contractions, through increasing cAMP levels in the myometrium.

In culture, trophoblast CRH is inhibited by progesterone, which remains high throughout pregnancy. Its release is stimulated by glucocorticoids and catecholamines, which increase prior to parturition lifting this progesterone block.

== Structure ==
The 41-amino acid sequence of CRH was first discovered in sheep by Vale et al. in 1981. Its full sequence is:

- SQEPPISLDLTFHLLREVLEMTKADQLAQQAHSNRKLLDIA

The rat and human peptides are identical and differ from the ovine sequence only by 7 amino acids.

- SEEPPISLDLTFHLLREVLEMARAEQLAQQAHSNRKLMEII

== Role in non-mammalian vertebrates ==
In mammals, studies suggest that CRH has no significant thyrotropic effect. However, in representatives of all non-mammalian vertebrates, it has been found that, in addition to its corticotropic function, CRH has a potent thyrotropic function, acting with TRH to control the hypothalamic–pituitary–thyroid axis (TRH has been found to be less potent than CRH in some species).

== See also ==
- Corticotropin-releasing hormone receptor
- ACTH
- Glucocorticoids
- Proopiomelanocortin
- Hypothalamic-pituitary-adrenal axis
- Cushing's syndrome
- Addison's disease
