= Preoptic nucleus =

Preoptic nucleus can refer to:

- Median preoptic nucleus
- Ventrolateral preoptic nucleus
- Anterodorsal preoptic nucleus
- Preoptic area
