= Circumventricular organs =

Interfaces between the brain and the circulatory system

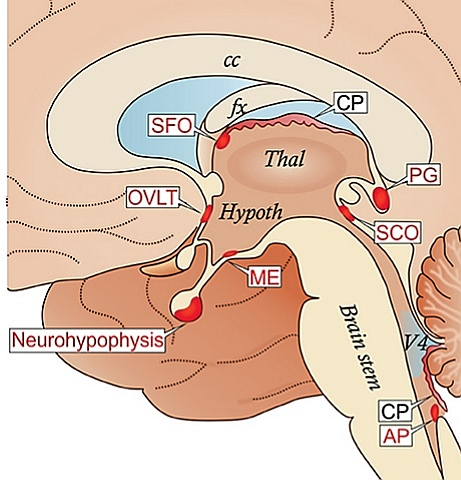
- Diagram showing locations of the circumventricular organs

Identifiers
- MeSH: D066280
- NeuroLex ID: nlx_anat_20090312
- FMA: 84081

Circumventricular organs (CVO; circum: around, ventricular: of ventricle) are structures in the brain characterized by their extensive and highly permeable capillaries, unlike those in the rest of the brain where there exists a blood–brain barrier (BBB) at the capillary level. Although the term "circumventricular organs" was originally proposed in 1958 by Austrian anatomist Helmut O. Hofer concerning structures around the brain ventricular system, the penetration of blood-borne dyes into small specific CVO regions was discovered in the early 20th century. The permeable CVOs enabling rapid neurohumoral exchange include the subfornical organ (SFO), the area postrema (AP), the vascular organ of lamina terminalis (VOLT—also known as the organum vasculosum of the lamina terminalis (OVLT)), the median eminence, the pituitary neural lobe, and the pineal gland.

The circumventricular organs are midline structures around the third and fourth ventricles that are in contact with blood and cerebrospinal fluid, and they facilitate special types of communication between the central nervous system and peripheral blood. Additionally, they are an integral part of neuroendocrine function. Highly permeable capillaries allow the CVOs to act as an alternative route for peptides and hormones in the neural tissue to sample from and secrete to circulating blood. CVOs also have roles in body fluid regulation, cardiovascular functions, immune responses, thirst, feeding behavior and reproductive behavior.

CVOs can be classified as either sensory or secretory organs serving homeostatic functions and body water balance. The sensory organs include the area postrema, the subfornical organ, and the vascular organ of lamina terminalis, all having the ability to sense signals in blood, then pass that information neurally to other brain regions. Through their neural circuitry, they provide direct information to the autonomic nervous system from the systemic circulation. The secretory organs include the subcommissural organ (SCO), the pituitary gland, the median eminence, and the pineal gland. These organs are responsible for secreting hormones and glycoproteins into the peripheral blood using feedback from both the brain environment and external stimuli.

Circumventricular organs contain capillary networks that vary between one another and within individual organs both in density and permeability, with most CVO capillaries having a permeable endothelial cell layer, except for those in the subcommissural organ. Furthermore, all CVOs contain neural tissue, enabling a neuroendocrine role.

Although the choroid plexus also has permeable capillaries, it does not contain neural tissue; rather, its primary role is to produce cerebrospinal fluid (CSF), and therefore is typically not classified as a CVO.

== Sensory organs ==
The sensory organs are the area postrema, the vascular organ of the lamina terminalis, and the subfornical organ.

Human brain circumventricular organs in detail

Human brain: Circumventricular organs - General

Human brain: 3rd and 4th ventricles

Human brain: Organum vasculosum

Human brain: Subfornical organ

Human brain: Pineal gland

Human brain: Subcommissural organ

Human brain: Area postrema

=== Area postrema ===
==== Anatomy ====
The area postrema is located in the caudal medulla oblongata near the junction of the brainstem and the spinal cord. In humans and in most other mammals that have been studied, it consists of swellings on either wall of the fourth ventricle. In rodents and lagomorphs, however, the area postrema forms a midline structure dorsal to the obex. When viewed histologically for its capillary distribution and morphology, the area postrema has numerous subregions separated according to capillary permeability, rates of blood flow, and duration of blood transit through respective capillary beds.

==== Function ====
Relatively little is known about the function of the area postrema in humans. However, there is strong evidence that the area postrema acts as the chemoreceptor trigger zone for vomiting, which is triggered by the presence of noxious stimulation from the blood. There is also evidence that the area postrema is the site at which angiotensin stimulates glucose metabolism, presumed efferent neural activity, blood pressure control, and thirst. The area postrema also has integrative capacities that enable it to send major and minor efferents to sections of the brain involved in the autonomic control of cardiovascular and respiratory activities.

=== Vascular organ of the lamina terminalis ===
==== Anatomy ====
Classified as a sensory circumventricular organ (along with the SFO and AP), the vascular organ of lamina terminalis (VOLT) is situated in the anterior wall of the third ventricle. Characteristically of the CVOs, it lacks the tight endothelial blood brain barrier. The vascular organ is further characterized by the afferent inputs from the subfornical organ (SFO), the median pre-optic nucleus (MnPO) region, the brainstem, and even the hypothalamus. Conversely, the vascular organ of the lamina terminalis maintains efferent projections to the stria medullaris and basal ganglia.

As a major player in the maintenance of the mammalian body fluid homeostasis, the VOLT features the primary neurons responsible for osmosensory balance. These neurons, in turn, feature angiotensin type I receptors, which are used by circulating angiotensin II to initiate water intake and sodium consumption. In addition to the angiotensin receptors, the neurons of the VOLT are also characterized by the presence of a nonselective cation channel deemed the transient receptor potential vanilloid 1, or TRPV1. Though there are other receptors within the TRPV family, a study by Ciura, Liedtke, and Bourque demonstrated that hypertonicity sensing operated via a mechanical mechanism of TRPV1 but not TRPV4. Despite a significant amount of data, the anatomy of the VOLT is not yet fully comprehended.

==== Function ====
As previously mentioned, the vascular organ of lamina terminalis features neurons responsible for the homeostatic conservation of osmolarity. In addition, the fenestrated vasculature of the VOLT allows the astrocytes and neurons of the VOLT to perceive a wide variety of plasma molecules whose signals may be transduced into other regions of the brain, thereby eliciting autonomic and inflammatory reactions.

In experiments, mammalian VOLT neurons were shown to transduce hypertonicity by the activation of the TRPV1 nonselective cation channels. These channels are highly permeable to calcium and are responsible for membrane depolarization and increased action potential discharge. Stated simply, an increase in osmolarity results in a reversible depolarization of the VOLT neurons. This can be seen through the predominantly excitatory effects of ANG on the VOLT through the TRPV1 receptor. In this context, it is worthy to note the VOLT neurons typically feature a resting membrane potential in the range of -50 to -67 mV with input resistances ranging from 65 to 360 MΩ.

Despite a solid understanding of the VOLT's role in the maintenance of body fluid homeostasis, other functions are less understood. For example, it is thought that the VOLT may also play a role in the regulation of LH secretion via a negative feedback mechanism. It is also hypothesized that the VOLT may be the mechanism through which pyrogens function to initiate a febrile response in the CNS. Finally, VOLT neurons have been observed to respond to temperature changes indicating that the organum vasculosum of the lamina terminalis is subject to different climates.

=== Subfornical organ (SFO) ===
==== Anatomy ====
The subfornical organ is a sensory CVO situated on the underside of the fornix and lacking a BBB, the absence of which characterizes the circumventricular organs. Protruding into the third ventricle of the brain, the highly vascularized SFO can be divided into 3–4 anatomical zones, especially by its capillary density and structure. The central zone is composed exclusively of the glial cells and neuronal cell bodies. Conversely, the rostral and caudal areas are mostly made of nerve fibers while few neurons and glial cells can be seen in this area. Functionally, however, the SFO may be viewed in two portions – the dorsolateral peripheral division and the ventromedial core segment.

The SFO has many efferent projections, shown to broadcast efferent projections to regions involved in cardiovascular regulation including the lateral hypothalamus with fibers terminating in the supraoptic (SON) and paraventricular (PVN) nuclei, and the anteroventral 3rd ventricle (AV3V) with fibers terminating in the VOLT and the median preoptic area. It seems that the most essential of all these connections is the SFO's projections to the paraventricular hypothalamic nucleus. Based on their functional relevance, the SFO neurons can be branded as either GE, featuring nonselective cation channels, or GI, featuring potassium channels. While the afferent projections of the SFO are considered less important than the various efferent connections, it is still notable that the subfornical organ receives synaptic input from the zona incerta and arcuate nucleus.

Study of subfornical organ anatomy is still ongoing but evidence has demonstrated slow blood transit time which may facilitate the sensory capability of SFO, enabling increased contact time for blood-borne signals to penetrate its permeable capillaries and influence regulation of blood pressure and body fluids. This observation coincides with the fact that SFO neurons have been shown to be intrinsically osmosensitive. Finally, it has been established that SFO neurons maintain resting membrane potential in the range of -57 to -65 mV.

==== Function ====
The subfornical organ is active in many bodily processes including, but not limited to, osmoregulation, cardiovascular regulation, Both hyper- and hypotonic stimuli facilitated an osmotic response. This observation demonstrated the fact that the SFO is involved in the maintenance of blood pressure. Featuring an AT1 receptor for ANG, the SFO neurons demonstrate an excitatory response when activated by ANG, therefore increasing blood pressure. The induction of the drinking response via the SFO can be antagonized, however, by the peptide, ANP. Additional research has demonstrated that the subfornical organ may be an important intermediary though which leptin acts to maintain blood pressure within normal physiological limits via descending autonomic pathways associated with cardiovascular control.

Recent research has focused on the subfornical organ as an area particularly important in the regulation of energy. The observation that subfornical neurons respond to a wide range of circulating energy balance signals, and that electrical stimulation of the SFO in rats resulted in food intake supports the SFO's importance in energy homeostasis. Additionally, it is assumed that the SFO is the lone forebrain structure capable of constant monitoring of circulating concentrations of glucose. This responsiveness to glucose again serves to solidify the SFO's integral role as a regulator of energy homeostasis.

== Secretory organs ==
=== Subcommissural organ ===
==== Anatomy ====
The subcommissural organ (SCO) is a small secretory organ located on the ventral surface of the posterior commissure near the anterior entrance of the cerebral aqueduct. It differs from other CVOs in that it does not have highly permeable capillaries. Its role as a neuroendocrine structure associated with the ventricular system qualifies it for classification as a CVO. Related to its secretory function, the SCO is partially composed of ependymal cells. These ependymocytes are characterized by elongated cell bodies that contain secretory materials and are covered in cilia. The most prominent of these is the glycoprotein SCO-spondin.

==== Function ====
One function of the SCO is the secretion of the glycoprotein SCO-spondin, which is released into the third ventricle where it aggregates to create Reissner's fiber. Reissner's fiber is a long fibrous projection that travels caudally through the Sylvian aqueduct and terminates in the spinal cord. This fiber is thought to contribute to the maintenance of the patency of the Sylvian aqueduct.

While the function of the subcommissural organ remains under investigation, it may be part of the mechanism of aldosterone secretion and CSF detoxification, along with osmoregulation. The SCO is innervated by many systems, the most common of which is associated with the serotonergic system, which influences water and sodium intake. During water deprivation, it will also reduce its innervation to the SCO. The reduction of input to the SCO causes a marked decrease in RF production. This finding implies that the subcommissural organ and its associated Reissner's fiber are integral parts of fluid electrolyte balance and water homeostasis.

=== Pituitary neural lobe ===
The pituitary gland is subdivided into lobes – the anterior pituitary, the intermediate pituitary, and the posterior pituitary (also known as the adenohypophysis and neurohypophysis (or neural lobe), respectively). Each one functions as a separate endocrine organ.

The pituitary neural lobe consists of axonal projections that directly extend from cell bodies in the hypothalamus through the infundibulum. Under neurohumoral control, it secretes oxytocin and vasopressin, thereby qualifying it as a circumventricular organ with both neural and secretory functions.

The anterior pituitary contains non-neural secretory cells derived from oral ectoderm which are indirectly controlled by "releasing hormones" from the median eminence of the hypothalamus, through the hypophyseal portal circulation.

The intermediate lobe (also called pars intermedia) synthesizes and secretes a hormone stimulating melanocytes under neural control by the hypothalamus. It is not commonly included among circumventricular organs.

The pituitary gland is located in the sella turcica of the sphenoid bone at the base of the skull.

=== Median eminence ===
The median eminence (ME) is located in the inferior portion of the hypothalamus and is ventral to the third ventricle. While some publications do not list the ME as a CVO, when it is considered to be a circumventricular organ, it is classified as a secretory organ. The median eminence is rich in fenestrated capillaries, allowing for the passage of proteins and neurohormones. More specifically, the median eminence allows for the transport of neurohormones between the CSF and the peripheral blood supply. The major cell type that makes up the median eminence are specialized ependymal cells known as tanycytes. These contribute to the organ's ability to selectively allow macromolecules to pass from the central to the peripheral neuroendocrine systems. Ventromedial subregions of the bilateral hypothalamic arcuate nucleus display relatively high capillary permeability, indicating this nucleus may have moment-to-moment regulatory roles for sensing and neurally conveying hormonal signals.

Tanycytes line the floor of the third ventricle and can be characterized by a singular long projection that delves deep inside the hypothalamus. Tanycytes have been evolutionarily linked to radial glial cells of the central nervous system. The tanycytes of the median eminence are often found along the fenestrated peripheral capillaries. They are tightly packed on the capillaries, forming a seal between the third ventricle and the median eminence. This seal can be attributed to the tight junctions observed between tanycytes and functions to restrict the travel of molecules between the median eminence and the third ventricle. The median eminence is also closely linked to the transport of GnRH between the median eminence and the anterior pituitary. Neuronal projections of GnRH neurons actually end at the median eminence, allowing for its release into the portal blood system.

=== Pineal gland ===
==== Anatomy ====
===== Gross anatomy =====
The morphology of the pineal gland varies greatly among mammals. The most commonly used classification for this gland takes into account its location relative to the diencephalon and the third ventricle of the brain, as well as its size and shape. Under these conditions, the human pineal gland is classified as type A. A type A pineal gland rests proximally to the posterior section of the diencephalon. It is located within 1-2mm of the midline of the brain. The pineal gland starts to develop during the second month of gestation. In the average adult, the dimensions are as follow: 5-9mm in length, 1-5mm in width and 3-5mm in thickness. Its average weight is 100–180 mg. The pineal gland consists of a central core made up of small lobes and a cortex that possesses a diffuse distribution of neurons. The principal cell type of the pineal is the pinealocyte sensu stricto. This type of cell has a prominent nucleus and a granular appearance.

===== Vascularization and innervation =====
The level of vascularization in the pineal gland is high. It receives a large supply of blood from branches of the posterior choroidal arteries that derive from cerebral arteries in the posterior mesencephalon.

The pineal gland is innervated by fibers from the peripheral parasympathetic and sympathetic systems, in addition to fibers from the central nervous system. The most important set of fibers involved are the unmyelinated postganglionic sympathetic fibers from the superior cervical ganglia, which also form the bilateral nervi conarii. The second set of fibers enters the pineal gland anteriorly via the commissural peduncles. The third set of fibers is myelinated and forms the ventro-lateral pineal tract.

==== Function ====
The pineal gland is considered a secretory organ and its activity shows circadian oscillations. Its main function – secretion of the hormone melatonin – rests when there is no input from the primary circadian pacemaker in the suprachiasmatic nuclei. Melatonin production is controlled by the previously mentioned circadian timing and is suppressed by light. Pineal tumors can affect sexual development, but the mechanism has yet to be established.

===== Other pineal substances =====
Other peptides aside from melatonin have been detected in the pineal. They are most likely associated with a type of innervation deemed "pineal peptidergic innervation." These include vasopressin, oxytocin, VIP, NPY, peptide histidine isoleucine, calcitonin gene-related peptide, substance P and somatostatin.
