= MNPO =

MNPO may stand for:

- Median Pre-Optic nucleus (MnPO)
- Master of Nonprofit Organizations
