= Septum verum =

Region of the brain

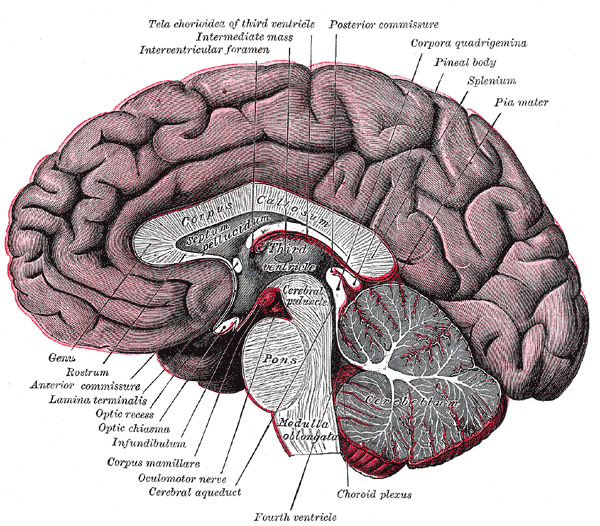
- Median sagittal section of brain

Details

Identifiers
- Latin: Septum verum (lamina septi vera)

Septum Verum (true septum) is a region in the lower medial part of the telencephalon that separates the two cerebral hemispheres. The human septum consists of two parts: the septum pellucidum (translucent septum), a thin membrane consisting of white matter and glial cells that separate the lateral ventricles, and the lower, precommisural septum verum, which consists of nuclei and grey matter. The term is sometimes used synonymously with Area Septalis, to refer to the precommisural part of the lower base of the telencephalon. The Septum verum contains the septal nuclei, which are usually considered part of the limbic system.

== Syntopy ==
Laterally, the septum verum reaches the lower part of the lateral ventricles, with the septal nuclei forming a bulge into the medial side of the ventricles. Dorsally can be found the septum pellucidum, a thin membrane of glial cells and fibres that separate the ventricles, and anteriorly is the lamina terminalis. It continues caudally as the pre-optic area and hypothalamus. The subfornical organ (SFO) can also be found in this area, between the ventral side of the fornix and the interventricular foramina.

== Function ==
The septum is considered a part of the limbic system, mediating the connection between the cortex and subcortical limbic nuclei. The septum projects fibres to the hypothalamus, hippocampus, amygdala, reticular formation and olfactory cortical areas, suggesting a role in limbic regulation.

While the exact function remains controversial, the septum is considered a pleasure zone in animals, studies have shown that stimulation of the septal area can bring feelings of satisfaction to euphoria and damage can cause hyperactivity and fury.

== Evolutionary Significance ==
With the exception of the nucleus septalis triangularis, all septal nuclei appear to have progressed in size during the evolution of higher primates.

== See also ==
- Septum Pellucidum
- Septal Nuclei

This article uses anatomical terminology; for an overview, see Anatomical terminology.
