= José Manuel Rodríguez Delgado =

Spanish scientist

- Born: August 8, 1915; Ronda, Spain
- Died: September 15, 2011 (aged 96); San Diego, California
- Education: University of Madrid; Cajal Institute; Yale University
- Known for: Stimoceiver
- Scientific career
- Fields: Neuroscience, Physiology, Psychiatry
- Workplaces: Yale University

José Manuel Rodríguez Delgado (August 8, 1915 – September 15, 2011) was a Spanish professor of neurophysiology at Yale University, famed for his research on mind control through electrical stimulation of the brain.

== Biography ==
Rodríguez Delgado was born in Ronda, in the province of Málaga, Spain in 1915. He received a Doctor of Medicine degree from the University of Madrid just before the outbreak of the Spanish Civil War. During the Spanish Civil War he joined the Republican side and served as a medical corpsman while he was a medical student. Rodríguez Delgado was held in a concentration camp for five months after the war ended. After serving in the camp, he had to repeat his M.D. degree, and then gained a PhD at the Ramón y Cajal Institute in Madrid.

Rodríguez Delgado's father was an eye doctor and he had planned to follow in his footsteps. However, once he discovered the writings of Santiago Ramón y Cajal, a Nobel laureate in 1906, and after having spent some time in a physiology laboratory, Delgado no longer wanted to be an eye doctor. Delgado became captivated by "the many mysteries of the brain. How little was known then. How little is known now!"

In 1946 Rodríguez Delgado won a fellowship at Yale University in the department of physiology under the direction of John F. Fulton. In 1950, Rodríguez Delgado accepted a position in the physiology department which at the time was headed by John Fulton. By 1952, he had co-authored his first paper on implanting electrodes into humans.

The Spanish minister of Education, Villar Palasí, asked Rodríguez Delgado to help organize a new medical school at the Autonomous University of Madrid. Rodríguez Delgado accepted Palasí's proposal and relocated to Spain with his wife and two children in 1974.

Rodríguez Delgado had last moved with his wife, Caroline, to San Diego, California before his death on September 15, 2011.

== Research ==
Rodríguez Delgado's research interests centered on the use of electrical signals to evoke responses in the brain. His earliest work was with cats, but he later did experiments with monkeys and humans, including psychiatric patients.

Much of Rodríguez Delgado's work was with an invention he called a stimoceiver, a radio which joined a stimulator of brain waves with a receiver which monitored EEG waves and sent them back on separate radio channels. Some of these stimoceivers were as small as half-dollars. This allowed the subject of the experiment full freedom of movement while allowing the experimenter to control the experiment. This was a great improvement from his early equipment which included visual disturbance in those whose wires ran from the brain to bulky equipment that both recorded data and delivered the desired electrical charges to the brain. This early equipment, while not allowing for a free range of movement, was also the cause of infection in many subjects.

The stimoceiver could be used to stimulate emotions and control behavior. According to Rodríguez Delgado, "Stimulation of different points in the amygdala and hippocampus in the four patients produced a variety of effects, including pleasant sensations, elation, deep, thoughtful concentration, odd feelings, super relaxation, colored visions, and other responses." Rodríguez Delgado stated that "brain transmitters can remain in a person's head for life. The energy to activate the brain transmitter is transmitted by way of radio frequencies."

Using the stimoceiver, Rodríguez Delgado found that he could not only elicit emotions, but he could also elicit specific physical reactions. These specific physical reactions, such as the movement of a limb or the clenching of a fist, were achieved when Rodríguez Delgado stimulated the motor cortex. Individuals whose implants were stimulated to produce a reaction were unable to resist the reaction, with one patient remarking, "I guess, doctor, that your electricity is stronger than my will." One of Rodríguez Delgado's most promising finds is related to an area called the septum verum, a structure within the brain's limbic system. This area, when stimulated by Rodríguez Delgado, produced feelings of strong euphoria. These euphoric feelings were sometimes strong enough to overcome physical pain and depression.

Rodríguez Delgado created many inventions and was called a "technological wizard" by one of his Yale colleagues. Other than the stimoceiver, Rodríguez Delgado also created a "chemitrode" which was an implantable device that released controlled amounts of a drug into specific brain areas. Rodríguez Delgado also invented an early version of what is now a cardiac pacemaker.

In Rhode Island, Rodríguez Delgado did some work at what is now a closed mental hospital. He chose patients who were "desperately ill patients whose disorders had resisted all previous treatments" and implanted electrodes in about 25 of them. Most of these patients were either schizophrenics or epileptics. To determine the best placement of electrodes within the human patients, Delgado initially looked to the work of Wilder Penfield, who studied epileptics' brains in the 1930s, as well as earlier animal experiments, and studies of brain-damaged people.

The most famous example of the stimoceiver in action occurred at a Córdoba bull breeding ranch. Rodríguez Delgado stepped into the ring with a bull which had had a stimoceiver implanted within its brain. The bull charged Delgado, who pressed a remote control button which caused the bull to stop its charge. Always one for theatrics, he taped this stunt and it can be seen today. The region of the brain Rodríguez Delgado stimulated when he pressed the hand-held transmitter was the caudate nucleus. This region was chosen to be stimulated because the caudate nucleus is involved in controlling voluntary movements. Rodríguez Delgado claimed that the stimulus caused the bull to lose its aggressive instinct. It has been argued that it was easier to block motor control than motivation or feelings. However, the public understood that mind control was near.

Although the bull incident was widely mentioned in popular media, Rodríguez Delgado believed that his experiment with a female chimpanzee named Paddy was more significant. Paddy was fitted with a stimoceiver linked to a computer that detected the brain signal called a spindle which was emitted by her part of the brain called the amygdala. When the spindle was recognized, the stimoceiver sent a signal to the central gray area of Paddy's brain, producing an 'aversive reaction'. In this case, the aversive reaction was an unpleasant or painful feeling. The result of the aversive reaction to the stimulus was a negative feedback to the brain. Within hours her brain was producing fewer spindles as a result of the negative feedback. As a result, Paddy became "quieter, less attentive and less motivated during behavioral testing". Although Paddy's reaction was not exactly ideal, Rodríguez Delgado hypothesized that the method used on Paddy could be used on others to stop panic attacks, seizures, and other disorders controlled by certain signals within the brain.

== Publication ==
José Rodríguez Delgado authored 134 scientific publications within two decades (1950–1970) on electrical stimulation on cats, monkeys and patients – psychotic and non-psychotic. In 1963, New York Times featured his experiments on their front page. Rodríguez Delgado had implanted a stimoceiver in the caudate nucleus of a fighting bull. He could stop the animal mid-way that would come running towards a waving flag.

He was invited to write his book Physical Control of the Mind: Toward a Psychocivilised Society as the forty-first volume in a series entitled World Perspectives edited by Ruth Nanda Anshen. In it Rodríguez Delgado has discussed how we have managed to tame and civilize our surrounding nature, arguing that now it was time to civilize our inner being. The book has been a centre of controversy since its release. The tone of the book was challenging and the philosophical speculations went beyond the data. Its intent was to encourage less cruelty, and a more benevolent, happier, better man, however it clashed with religious sentiments.

José Rodríguez Delgado continued to publish his research and philosophical ideas through articles and books for the next quarter century. He in all wrote over 500 articles and six books. His final book in 1989, was named Happiness and had 14 editions.

=== Books ===
- Physical Control of the Mind: Toward a Psychocivilized Society. New York: Harper & Row, 1969. ISBN 978-0060902087.

== In media ==
- The story of Rodríguez Delgado's mind control research was featured in an episode of Dark Matters: Twisted But True in a segment entitled "Human Puppets" as well as the controversy sparked by his research.
- Rodríguez Delgado, then aged 91, was also featured in person in a 2006 episode of the BBC documentary series Horizon, "Human v2.0".
- The Bonfire of the Vanities mentions Delgado in the following quote. "In 1969 Jose M. R. Delgado, the eminent Spanish brain physiologist, pronounced the Bororos correct. For nearly three millennia, Western philosophers had viewed the self as something unique, something encased inside each person's skull, so to speak. This inner self had to deal with and learn from the outside world, of course, and it might prove incompetent in doing so. Nevertheless, at the core of one's self there was presumed to be something irreducible and inviolate. Not so, said Delgado. 'Each person is a transitory composite of materials borrowed from the environment.'"
