= Fluid balance =

Aspect of homeostasis concerning control of the amount of water in an organism

Fluid balance is an aspect of the homeostasis of organisms in which the amount of water in the organism needs to be controlled, via osmoregulation and behavior, such that the concentrations of electrolytes (salts in solution) in the various body fluids are kept within healthy ranges. The core principle of fluid balance is that the amount of water lost from the body must equal the amount of water taken in; for example, in humans, the output (via respiration, perspiration, urination, defecation, and expectoration) must equal the input (via eating and drinking, or by parenteral intake). Euvolemia is the state of normal body fluid volume, including blood volume, interstitial fluid volume, and intracellular fluid volume; hypovolemia and hypervolemia are imbalances. Water is necessary for all life on Earth. Humans can survive for 4 to 6 weeks without food but only for a few days without water.

Profuse sweating can increase the need for electrolyte replacement. Water-electrolyte imbalance produces headache and fatigue if mild; illness if moderate, and sometimes even death if severe. For example, water intoxication (which results in hyponatremia), the process of consuming too much water too quickly, can be fatal. Deficits to body water result in volume contraction and dehydration. Diarrhea is a threat to both body water volume and electrolyte levels, which is why diseases that cause diarrhea are great threats to fluid balance.

== Implications ==
=== Water consumption ===
The recommended daily amount of drinking water for humans varies. It depends on activity, age, health, and environment. In the United States, the Adequate Intake for total water, based on median intakes, is 4.0 litres (141 imp fl oz; 135 US fl oz) per day for males older than 18, and 3.0 litres (106 imp fl oz; 101 US fl oz) per day for females over 18; it assumes about 80% from drink and 20% from food. The European Food Safety Authority recommends 2.0 litres (70 imp fl oz; 68 US fl oz) of total water per day for women and 2.5 litres (88 imp fl oz; 85 US fl oz) per day for men.

The common advice to drink 8 glasses (1,900 mL or 64 US fl oz) of plain water per day is not scientific; thirst is a better guide for how much water to drink than is a specific, fixed amount. Americans aged 21 and older, on average, drink 1,043 mL (36.7 imp fl oz; 35.3 US fl oz) of drinking water a day, and 95% drink less than 2,958 mL (104.1 imp fl oz; 100.0 US fl oz) per day. Exercise and heat exposure cause loss of water and therefore may induce thirst and greater water intake. Active people in hot climates may need 6.0 litres (211 imp fl oz; 203 US fl oz) of water, or more, per day.

How much drinking water contributes to the intake of mineral nutrients is unclear. Inorganic minerals generally enter surface water and groundwater via stormwater runoff and through the ground. Water treatment also adds some minerals, such as calcium, zinc, manganese, phosphate, fluoride, and sodium compounds. Water generated by the biochemical metabolism of nutrients provides a significant part of the daily water needs for some arthropods and desert animals, but provides only a small fraction of a human's necessary intake. There are trace elements in almost all potable water; some of these affect metabolism, such as sodium, potassium, and chloride, which are common in small amounts in most water. Other elements, such as fluoride, while beneficial in low concentrations, can cause dental and other problems at high levels.

Fluid balance is important to health. Profuse sweating can increase the need to replace electrolytes (salts). Water intoxication (the consumption of too much water too quickly) causes hyponatremia, which can cause death in minutes or hours. Water makes up about 60% of the body weight in men and 55% of weight in women. A baby is about 70% to 80%; old people are about 45% water.

=== Medical use ===
==== Effects of illness ====
When a person is ill, fluid may also be lost through vomiting, diarrhea, and hemorrhage. An individual is at an increased risk of dehydration in these instances, as the kidneys will find it more difficult to match fluid loss by reducing urine output (the kidneys must produce at least some urine in order to excrete metabolic waste.)

==== Oral rehydration therapy ====
Oral rehydration therapy (ORT), is type of fluid replacement used as a treatment for dehydration. In an acute hospital setting, fluid balance is monitored carefully. This provides information on the patient's state of hydration, kidney function and cardiovascular function.

- If fluid loss is greater than fluid gain (for example if the patient vomits and has diarrhea), the patient is said to be in negative fluid balance. In this case, fluid is often given intravenously to compensate for the loss.
- On the other hand, a positive fluid balance (where fluid gain is greater than fluid loss) might suggest a problem with either the kidney or cardiovascular system.

If blood pressure is low (hypotension), the filtration rate in the kidneys will lessen, causing less fluid reabsorption and thus less urine output.

An accurate measure of fluid balance is therefore an important diagnostic tool, and allows for prompt intervention to correct the imbalance.

== Routes of fluid loss and gain ==
Fluid can leave the body in many ways. Fluid can enter the body as preformed water, ingested food and drink and to a lesser extent as metabolic water which is produced as a by-product of aerobic respiration (cellular respiration) and dehydration synthesis.

=== Input ===
A constant supply is needed to replenish the fluids lost through normal physiological activities, such as respiration, sweating and urination. Water generated from the biochemical metabolism of nutrients provides a significant proportion of the daily water requirements for some arthropods and desert animals, but provides only a small fraction of a human's necessary intake.

In the normal resting state, input of water through ingested fluids is approximately 1200 ml/day, from ingested foods 1000 ml/day and from aerobic respiration 300 ml/day, totaling 2500 ml/day.

==== Regulation of input ====
Input of water is regulated mainly through ingested fluids, which, in turn, depends on thirst. An insufficiency of water results in an increased osmolarity in the extracellular fluid. This is sensed by osmoreceptors in the organum vasculosum of the lamina terminalis, which trigger thirst. Thirst can to some degree be voluntarily resisted, as during fluid restriction.

The human kidneys will normally adjust to varying levels of water intake. The kidneys will require time to adjust to the new water intake level. This can cause someone who drinks a lot of water to become dehydrated more easily than someone who routinely drinks less.

=== Output ===
- The majority of fluid output occurs via the urine, approximately 1500 ml/day (approx 1.59 qt/day) in the normal adult resting state.
- Some fluid is lost through perspiration (part of the body's temperature control mechanism) and as water vapor in exhaled air. These are termed "insensible fluid losses" as they cannot be easily measured. Some sources say insensible losses account for 500 to 650 ml/day (0.5 to 0.6 qt.) of water in adults, while other sources put the minimum value at 800 ml (0.8 qt.). In children, one calculation used for insensible fluid loss is 400 ml/m^{2} body surface area.
- In addition, an adult loses approximately 100 ml/day of fluid through feces.
- For females, an additional 50 ml/day is lost through vaginal secretions.

These outputs are in balance with the input of ~2500 ml/day.

==== Regulation of output ====
The body's homeostatic control mechanisms, which maintain a constant internal environment, ensure that a balance between fluid gain and fluid loss is maintained. The anti-diuretic hormones vasopressin (ADH) and aldosterone play a major role in this.

- If the body is becoming fluid-deficient, there will be an increase in the secretion of these hormones, causing fluid to be retained by the kidneys and urine output to be reduced.
- Conversely, if fluid levels are excessive, secretion of these hormones is suppressed, resulting in less retention of fluid by the kidneys and a subsequent increase in the volume of urine produced.

===== Antidiuretic hormone =====
If the body is becoming fluid-deficient, this will be sensed by osmoreceptors in the vascular organ of lamina terminalis and subfornical organ. These areas project to the supraoptic nucleus and paraventricular nucleus, which contain neurons that secrete the antidiuretic hormone, vasopressin, from their nerve endings in the posterior pituitary. Thus, there will be an increase in the secretion of antidiuretic hormone, causing fluid to be retained by the kidneys and urine output to be reduced.

===== Aldosterone =====
A fluid-insufficiency causes a decreased perfusion of the juxtaglomerular apparatus in the kidneys. This activates the renin–angiotensin system. Among other actions, it causes renal tubules (i.e. the distal convoluted tubules and the cortical collecting ducts) to reabsorb more sodium and water from the urine. Potassium is secreted into the tubule in exchange for the sodium, which is reabsorbed. The activated renin–angiotensin system stimulates the zona glomerulosa of the adrenal cortex which in turn secretes the hormone aldosterone. This hormone stimulates the reabsorption of sodium ions from distal tubules and collecting ducts. Water in the tubular lumen cannot follow the sodium reabsorption osmotically, as this part of the kidney is impermeable to water; release of ADH (vasopressin) is required to increase expression of aquaporin channels in the cortical collecting duct, allowing reabsorption of water.

== Effect on weight loss ==
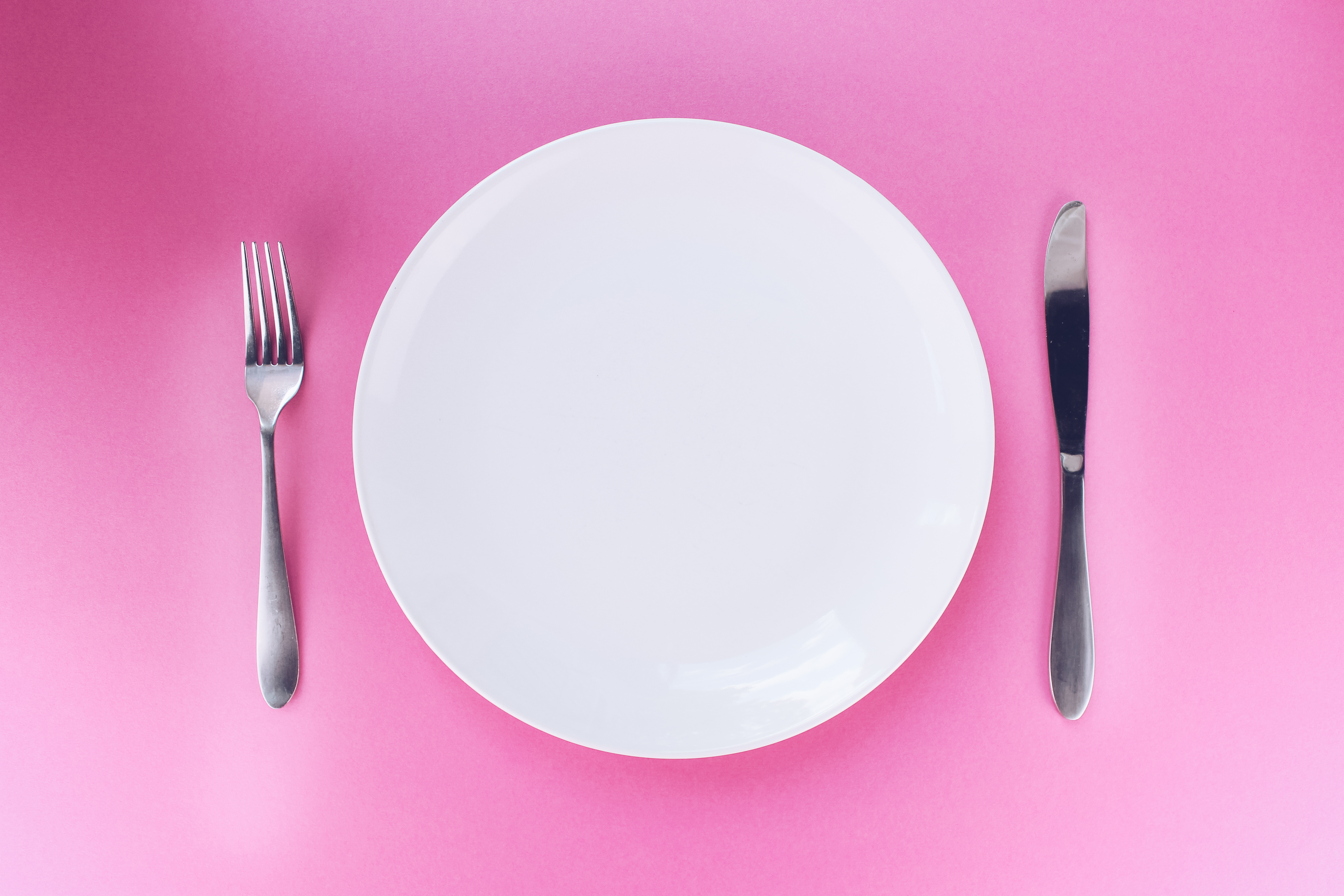
An empty plate

Fasting is the act of refraining from eating, and sometimes drinking. However, from a physiological context, "fasting" may refer to the metabolic status of a person who has not eaten overnight (before "breakfast"), or to the metabolic state achieved after complete digestion and absorption of a meal. Metabolic changes in the fasting state begin after absorption of a meal (typically 3–5 hours after eating).

A diagnostic fast is a prolonged fast, from 1–100 hours long (depending on age), conducted under observation, to facilitate the investigation of a health complication (usually hypoglycemia). Many people may also fast as part of a medical procedure or a check-up, such as preceding a colonoscopy or surgery, or before certain medical tests. Intermittent fasting is a technique sometimes used for weight loss or other health benefits that incorporates regular fasting into a person's dietary schedule. Fasting may also be part of a religious ritual, often associated with specific scheduled fast days, as determined by the religion, or be applied as a public demonstration for a given cause, in a practice known as a hunger strike.

== See also ==
- Drinking water
