= Osmoreceptor =

Sensory neuron that detects osmotic pressure changes in warm-blooded organisms

An osmoreceptor is a sensory receptor primarily found in the hypothalamus of most homeothermic organisms that detects changes in osmotic pressure. Osmoreceptors can be found in several structures, including two of the circumventricular organs – the vascular organ of the lamina terminalis, and the subfornical organ. They contribute to osmoregulation, controlling fluid balance in the body. Osmoreceptors are also found in the kidneys where they also modulate osmolality.

== Mechanism of activation in humans ==
Osmoreceptors are located in two of the circumventricular organs — the vascular organ of lamina terminalis (VOLT) and the subfornical organ. These two circumventricular organs are located along the anteroventral region of the third ventricle, called the AV3V region. Between these two organs is the median preoptic nucleus, which has multiple nerve connections with the two organs, as well as with the supraoptic nuclei and blood pressure control centers in the medulla oblongata.

The osmoreceptors have a defined functionality as neurons that are endowed with the ability to detect extracellular fluid osmolarity. Osmoreceptors have aquaporin 4 proteins spanning through their plasma membranes in which water can diffuse, from an area of high to low water concentration. If plasma osmolarity rises above 290 mOsmol/L, then water will move out of the cell due to osmosis, causing the neuroreceptor to shrink in size. Embedded into the cell membrane are stretch inactivated cation channels (SICs), which when the cell shrinks in size, open and allow positively charged ions, such as Na^{+} and K^{+} ions to enter the cell. This causes initial depolarisation of the osmoreceptor and activates voltage-gated sodium channel, which through a complex conformational change, allows more sodium ions to enter the neuron, leading to further depolarisation and an action potential to be generated. This action potential travels along the axon of the neuron, and causes the opening of voltage-dependent calcium channels in the axon terminal. This leads to a Ca^{2+} influx, due to calcium ions diffusing into the neuron along their electrochemical gradient. The calcium ions binds to the synaptotagmin 1 sub-unit of the SNARE protein attached to the arginine-vasopressin (AVP) containing vesicle membrane. This causes the fusion of the vesicle with the neuronal post synaptic membrane. Subsequent release of AVP into the posterior pituitary gland occurs, whereby vasopressin is secreted into the blood stream of the nearby capillaries.

== Macula densa ==
The macula densa region of the kidney's juxtaglomerular apparatus is another modulator of blood osmolality. The macula densa responds to changes in osmotic pressure through changes in the rate of sodium ion (Na^{+}) flow through the nephron. Decreased Na^{+} flow stimulates tubuloglomerular feedback to autoregulate, a signal (thought to be regulated by adenosine) sent to the nearby juxtaglomerular cells of the afferent arteriole, causing the juxtaglomerular cells to release the protease renin into circulation. Renin cleaves the zymogen angiotensinogen, always present in plasma as a result of constitutive production in the liver, into a second inactive form, angiotensin I, which is then converted to its active form, angiotensin II, by angiotensin converting enzyme (ACE), which is widely distributed in the small vessels of the body, but particularly concentrated in the pulmonary capillaries of the lungs. Angiotensin II exerts system wide effects, triggering aldosterone release from the adrenal cortex, direct vasoconstriction, and thirst behaviors originating in the hypothalamus. This is commonly known as the renin-angiotensin-aldosterone system.

== See also ==
- Hypothalamus
- Vasopressin
- Baroreceptors
