= Preoptic anterior hypothalamus =

The Preoptic anterior hypothalamus (or POAH) is the part of the brain that senses core body temperature and regulates it to about 36.8 °C (98.6 °F).

== See also ==
- Hypothalamus
- Preoptic area
- Thermoregulation
