= Median preoptic nucleus =

Nucleus in the anterior hypothalamus

Identifiers
- NeuroNames: 378
- NeuroLex ID: birnlex_1208
- TA98: A14.1.08.908
- TA2: 5711
- FMA: 62323

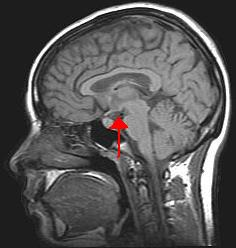
Location of the hypothalamus.

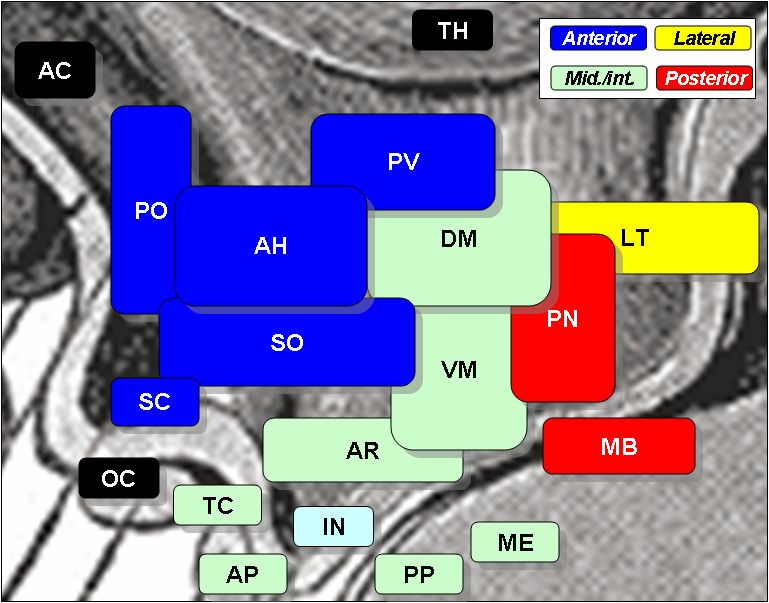
Nuclei of the Hypothalamus: The preoptic area is located in the anterior portion of the hypothalamus, superior to the optic chiasm.

The median preoptic nucleus is located dorsal to the other three nuclei of the preoptic area of the anterior hypothalamus. The hypothalamus is located just beneath the thalamus, the main relay station of the nervous system, and is considered part of the limbic system, which also includes structures such as the hippocampus and the amygdala. The hypothalamus is highly involved in maintaining homeostasis of the body, and the median preoptic nucleus is no exception, contributing to regulation of blood composition, body temperature, and non-REM sleep.

The median preoptic nucleus is highly involved in three main areas. These include osmoregulation, thermoregulation, and sleep homeostasis. Within each area are many functions. The role that the median preoptic nucleus plays in osmoregulation is in blood composition and volume, including fluid and salt balance, and produces responses ranging from behavioral to endocrine. Thermoregulation includes both responses to infection and to decreased core temperature upon cutaneous exposure to cold, both of which involve the median preoptic nucleus as an important mediator of sensory input and regulatory output. Sleep homeostasis is involved in both the onset and maintenance of sleep.

The median preoptic nucleus has excitatory and inhibitory projections to many areas of the brain. It has inhibitory influences through GABAergic projections to the areas of the brain involved in the stimulation of thermogenesis, as well as on wake-active areas of the brain to induce sleep. Microinjection of ethanol, triazolam, and propofol into this area induces sleep in rodents, suggesting that it is involved in their pharmacologic effects on sleep. Glutamatergic and noradrenergic, as well as other neurotransmitters, have excitatory influences on other areas of the brain. The median preoptic nucleus is highly involved in cardiovascular regulation, including the release of atrial natriuretic peptide by the heart in response to high blood volume. It also is involved in controlling febrile response to infection and stimulation of thirst, among other functions. Both the connectivity and anatomical position of the median preoptic nucleus allow it to be both a relay station and mediator for sensory and regulatory information, and produce neural, endocrine and behavioral responses to maintain homeostasis.

== Location ==
The median preoptic nucleus is located in the preoptic area of the hypothalamus. Forming a critical part of the anteroventral third ventricle and the midline of the lamina terminalis, the median preoptic nucleus occupies an anatomical position that allows it to play an important role in many aspects of homeostatic regulation. This region is important in cardiovascular, blood pressure, and blood composition regulation, and receives inputs from the subfornical organ (SFO) and the vascular organ of lamina terminalis (VOLT), which lie outside the blood brain barrier and relay information concerning blood osmolality and levels of endocrine signals such as atrial natriuretic peptide (ANP).

== Connectivity ==
Connectivity with other regions of the hypothalamus, such as the ventrolateral preoptic area (VLPO) and with regions of the brain stem also allow the median preoptic nucleus to be involved in other aspects of homeostasis. These include sleep-waking behaviors as well as thirst and drinking behavior, as well as thermoregulation. Parallel pathways in the preoptic area are involved in regulation of body temperature and fever response. One pathway originates in the median preoptic nucleus while the other originates in the dorsolateral preoptic area (DLPO). Both are inhibitory to areas in the brainstem which activate non-shivering thermogenesis via brown adipose tissue (BAT) in response to cutaneous cold or prostaglandin E2.

== Role in thermoregulation ==
It's known that mammals have a circadian rhythm in body temperature (Tb) that depend on the integrity of the suprachiasmatic nucleus (SCN), However, fasting also influences the Tb in the resting period and the presence of the SCN is essential for this process. Although not only the SCN but also the arcuate nucleus (ARC), are involved in the Tb setting through afferents to the thermoregulatory median preoptic nucleus (MnPO). It's known that the vasopressin release from the SCN decreases the temperature just before light onset, whereas a-melanocyte stimulating hormone release, especially at the end of the dark period, maintains high temperature. Both peptides have opposite effects on the brown adipose tissue activity through thermoregulatory nuclei such as the dorsomedial nucleus of the hypothalamus and the dorsal raphe nucleus. Coordination between circadian and metabolic signaling within the hypothalamus is essential for an adequate temperature control. The balance between the releases of neuropeptides derived from the biological clock and from a metabolic sensory organ as the arcuate nucleus, are essential for an adequate temperature control. These observations show that brain areas involved in circadian and metabolic functions of the body need to interact to produce a coherent arrangement of physiological processes associated with temperature control.

The neural activation mechanisms involved in the regulation of body temperature are largely undefined. It is known that sympathetic pathways are involved in increasing heat production and reducing heat loss and are activated by neurons in the rostral medullary raphe (RMR). These neurons were identified as playing an important role in the elevation of body temperature during both cold exposure and induced fever by observation that hyperpolarization prior to exposure to these conditions inhibits the elevation of body temperature in response.

=== Febrile response ===
Inputs to the RMR from the median preoptic nucleus are GABAergic, and therefore inhibitory in nature. Lesions on the median preoptic nucleus produce diminished fever responses, as the projections from the MnPn to the RMR contain prostaglandin EP3 receptors, which are essential for fever response. Prostaglandin E2 binds to E3 receptors in the median preoptic nucleus to inhibit their activity and cause fever. This means that the median preoptic nucleus is responsible for inhibiting mechanisms which elevate body temperature. This is not the only area of the hypothalamus involved, and elimination of the activity of the median preoptic nucleus will not in and of itself cause elevated body temperature. When combined with lesions on other preoptic hypothalamic nuclei, however, damage to the median preoptic nucleus causes an elevated baseline body temperature.

=== Menopause ===
Other receptors, neurokinin 3 receptors, which are expressed in the median preoptic nucleus, are also involved in thermoregulation. Activation of these receptors in rats causes decrease in core temperature. These receptors are highly expressed in the median preoptic area in response to decreased estrogen levels in menopausal women, and are thought to play a role in the generation of hot flashes during menopause.

=== Environmental cold exposure ===
Responses to cold are produced by cutaneous cold sensitive pathways through the Parabrachial area. Thermoreceptors in the skin detect temperature in the environment relative to body temperature. These afferent neurons project up the spinal cord to the parabrachial area, which innervates several areas of the preoptic area, including the median preoptic nucleus. Exposure to cold leads to disinhibition of the RMR and other regions, which leads to brown adipose thermogenesis. This is also known as non-shivering thermogenesis, which metabolizes fat but dissipates heat from the proton motive force in mitochondria rather than using oxidative phosphorylation to produce ATP.

== Role in osmoregulation ==
The region of the brain which includes the ventral portion of the median preoptic nucleus, the anteroventral third ventricle (AV3V), is highly involved in the maintenance of fluid, electrolyte, and cardiovascular homeostasis. The median preoptic nucleus, along with the vascular organ of lamina terminalis (VOLT) and the subfornical organ (SFO) respond to changes in blood composition as well as neural input from receptors in blood vessels. Stretch receptors in the aorta and other vessels send sensory input to this region, relaying information about blood volume and blood pressure.

=== Response to changes in blood osmolality ===
The importance of the median preoptic nucleus in fluid composition and homeostasis can be seen anatomically, as it contains connections between several regions highly involved in body fluid balance and cardiovascular function, such as the paraventricular nucleus and the supraoptic nucleus.

Functionally, its importance can be understood because lesions to the median preoptic nucleus generally cause inappropriate fluid composition, water intake and release of atrial natriuretic peptide (ANP). The responses to the changes in fluid composition mediated by the median preoptic nucleus result from noradrenergic innervation from regions of the caudal ventrolateral medulla. Responses can be endocrine, autonomic or behavioral, and responses to spikes in blood sodium levels include the release of atrial natriuretic peptide and oxytocin. Atrial natriuretic peptide is released by the heart in response to high blood pressure and high salinity of the blood. It is an important and potent vasodilator, and also reduces the reuptake of sodium in the kidneys. In addition, it inhibits pathways such as the renin-aldostrone-angiotensin pathway which raise blood pressure.

Activation of the median preoptic nucleus leads to stimulation of the paraventricular nucleus (PVN). The afferents to this area are glutamatergic, or use glutamate as their primary neurotransmitter, although angiotensin II produces a similar response, and result in sympathoexcitation of the PVN. This was confirmed by the use of a glutamate receptor antagonist in the PVN, which inhibited this response as a result of the activation of the MnPn. Thus, glutamate bound to receptors is necessary for the activation of these neurons in the median preoptic nucleus and the activation of the paraventricular nucleus. The activation of the PVN via this glutamatergic mechanism results in increased activity of renal sympathetic nerve pathways as well as heart rate and mean arterial pressure.

== Role in homeostatic regulation of sleep ==
Anatomical and electrophysiological experiments on adult rats show an important role is for the median preoptic nucleus in the production of sleep. The first evidence of this was an observation that damage to this area caused insomnia in human patients. Current experiments using c-Fos expression as a marker for activation of neurons during sleep shows a dichotomy of function in sleep promotion and maintenance between the ventrolateral preoptic nucleus and the median preoptic nucleus. Evidence suggests that GABAergic neurons in the median preoptic nucleus play a role in the promotion of the onset of sleep, while neurons in the ventrolateral preoptic nucleus play a role in the maintenance of sleep. While the idea of a complete separation of function between these two nuclei is an attractive one, it is more likely a question of degree of involvement of these two nuclei in the onset and maintenance of sleep, rather than playing completely separate roles. It is likely that the MnPn plays an important, but not exclusive, role in the onset of sleep, while the VLPO plays a more important role in the maintenance of sleep. Both areas project to wake-active areas of the brain. There is also a dense, bidirectional neuronal projection between the median preoptic nucleus and the ventrolateral preoptic nucleus. These existence of inhibitory projections between the ventrolaternal preoptic nucleus and the median preoptic nucleus suggests shared function and a regulatory relationship between the two nuclei.

=== Non-REM sleep ===
The promotion of sleep by GABAergic neurons in the median preoptic area is most closely associated with NREM, or quiet sleep. The amount of time spent in NREM sleep increases with the number of activated GABA receptors in the median preoptic area, as demonstrated by increased time in NREM sleep in response to microinjections of GABA agonists into the median preoptic area of cats. Time spent in REM sleep did not increase, and control injections decreased time spent in both NREM and REM sleep.

=== Relationship with the VLPO ===
The ventrolateral (VLPO) and median preoptic (MnPn) nuclei promote sleep through GABAergic neuronal projections to wake-active areas of the brain. Activation of the neurons in the VLPO and MnPn leads to increased concentrations of the primary inhibitory neurotransmitter, GABA, in wakefulness areas of the brain, such as the tuberomammillary nucleus and the locus coeruleus. This leads to the inhibition of cholinergic, noradrenergic and serotonergic activity in these areas. Noradrenergic projections from wake-promoting areas inhibit sleep-promoting areas, establishing a "reciprocal inhibitory interaction" between sleep and wakefulness areas which leads to the regulation of sleep patterns. The mechanism for the activation of the sleep-promoting neurons in the VLPO and MnPn has not been well defined, however, it has been shown that afferent inputs from the MnPO activate VLPO neuronal networks by disinhibition. Moreover, it has also been suggested that the suprachiasmatic nucleus may play a role, as well as simply decreased sensory input at the onset of sleepiness.
