= Helmut Otto Hofer =

Austrian zoologist and anatomist

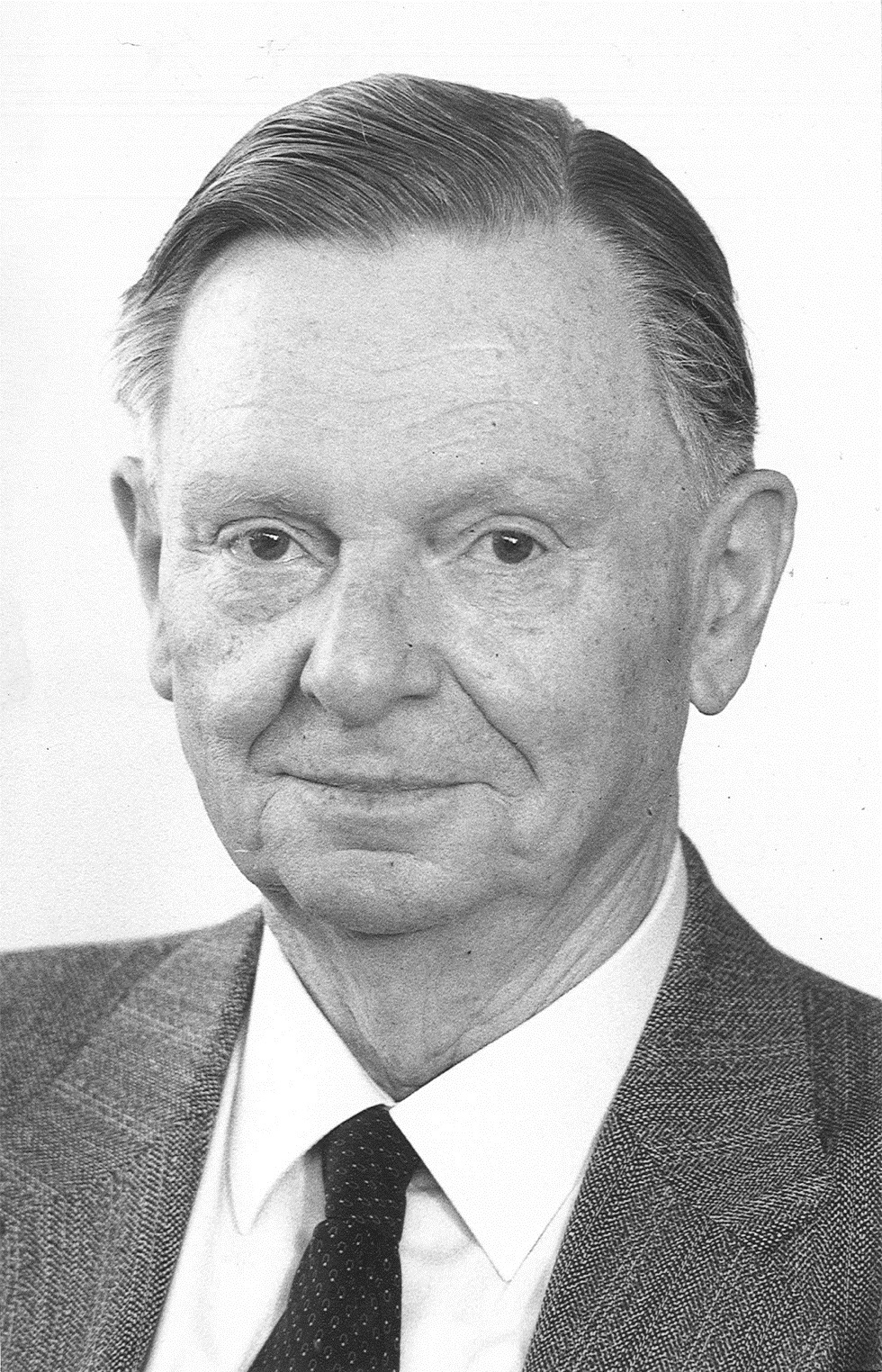
- Helmut Otto Hofer (1985)
- Born: October 22, 1912; Mährisch Weisskirchen, Austria-Hungary
- Died: July 26, 1989 (aged 76); Kassel, West Germany
- Education: University of Vienna
- Known for: comparative anatomy circumventricular organs
- Spouses: Lieselotte Ae, Herta Komoss
- Children: Wolfgang Otto Hofer, Thomas Karl Hofer, Klaus Christian Hofer
- Awards: Senior U.S. Scientist, Alexander von Humboldt Foundation (1974)
- Scientific career
- Fields: zoology neuroanatomy paleontology primatology
- Workplaces: State Museum of Zoology, Dresden; University of Vienna; Max Planck Institute for Brain Research; Tulane University; University of Kassel

Helmut Otto Hofer (22 October 1912 in Mährisch Weisskirchen, Moravia - 26 July 1989 in Kassel) was an Austrian zoologist and anatomist.

Hofer received his Doctor of Philosophy degree from the University of Vienna in 1937. From 1938 until 1945 he was at the State Museum of Zoology in Dresden, Germany, although, because of the annexation of Austria by Germany in 1938, his work was interrupted by military service in the German army. From 1949 until 1953, he worked as a research assistant at the Zoological Institute of the University of Vienna, and from 1953 until 1965 he was a researcher at the Max Planck Institute for Brain Research in Giessen and then in Frankfurt am Main. In 1965 he moved to the Delta Regional Primate Research Center (now the Tulane National Primate Research Center) in Covington, Louisiana, USA, where he remained until his retirement in 1977. From then until his death in 1989, he continued his work at the University of Kassel (Germany).

Hofer is known for his contributions to the fields of neuroanatomy, comparative anatomy, paleontology, and primatology, for which he received the Senior Scientist Award from the Alexander von Humboldt Foundation in 1974. He was the founding Secretary General (1964-1972) of the International Primatological Society. In 1958 he introduced the term "circumventricular organs" to describe a group of unusual structures located around the ventricles of the brain.
