= Vascular organ of lamina terminalis =

Details

Identifiers
- Latin: organum vasculosum laminae terminalis
- MeSH: D066278
- NeuroNames: 383
- NeuroLex ID: nlx_anat_100313
- TA98: A14.1.08.940
- TA2: 5781
- FMA: 62315

The vascular organ of lamina terminalis (VOLT), organum vasculosum of the lamina terminalis (OVLT), or supraoptic crest, is a sensory organ, one of the circumventricular organs of the third ventricle within the lamina terminalis. It is covered with pia mater, and lined with ependyma. It overlies the paraventricular nucleus of hypothalamus, and is involved in the secretion of vasopressin. The VOLT monitors the presence of peptides and macromolecules in the bloodstream, and conveys the information to the hypothalamus.

It is one of the three sensory circumventricular organs of the brain. The other four are secretory.

== Anteroventral third ventricle region ==
The VOLT, median eminence, and subfornical organ are interconnected with the mid-ventral hypothalamus, and together these three structures surround the third ventricle, a complex often called the anteroventral region of the third ventricle ("AV3V" region). This region functions in the regulation of fluid and electrolyte balance by controlling thirst, sodium excretion, blood volume regulation, and vasopressin secretion.

== Function ==
The VOLT is one of the three sensory circumventricular organs providing information to other brain regions.

VOLT capillaries do not have a blood–brain barrier, and so neurons in this region can respond to circulating factors present in the systemic circulation.

Neurons in the VOLT are osmoreceptors sensitive to the sodium content and osmotic pressure of blood. Neurons of the lamina terminalis project to the supraoptic nucleus and paraventricular nucleus to regulate the activity of vasopressin-secreting neurons. In a situation of lowered blood volume, secretion of renin by the kidneys results in the production of angiotensin II, which stimulates receptors in the VOLT and subfornical organ to complete a positive feedback loop. These neurons also project to the median preoptic nucleus which is involved in controlling thirst.
