= Thirst =

Craving for potable fluids experienced by animals

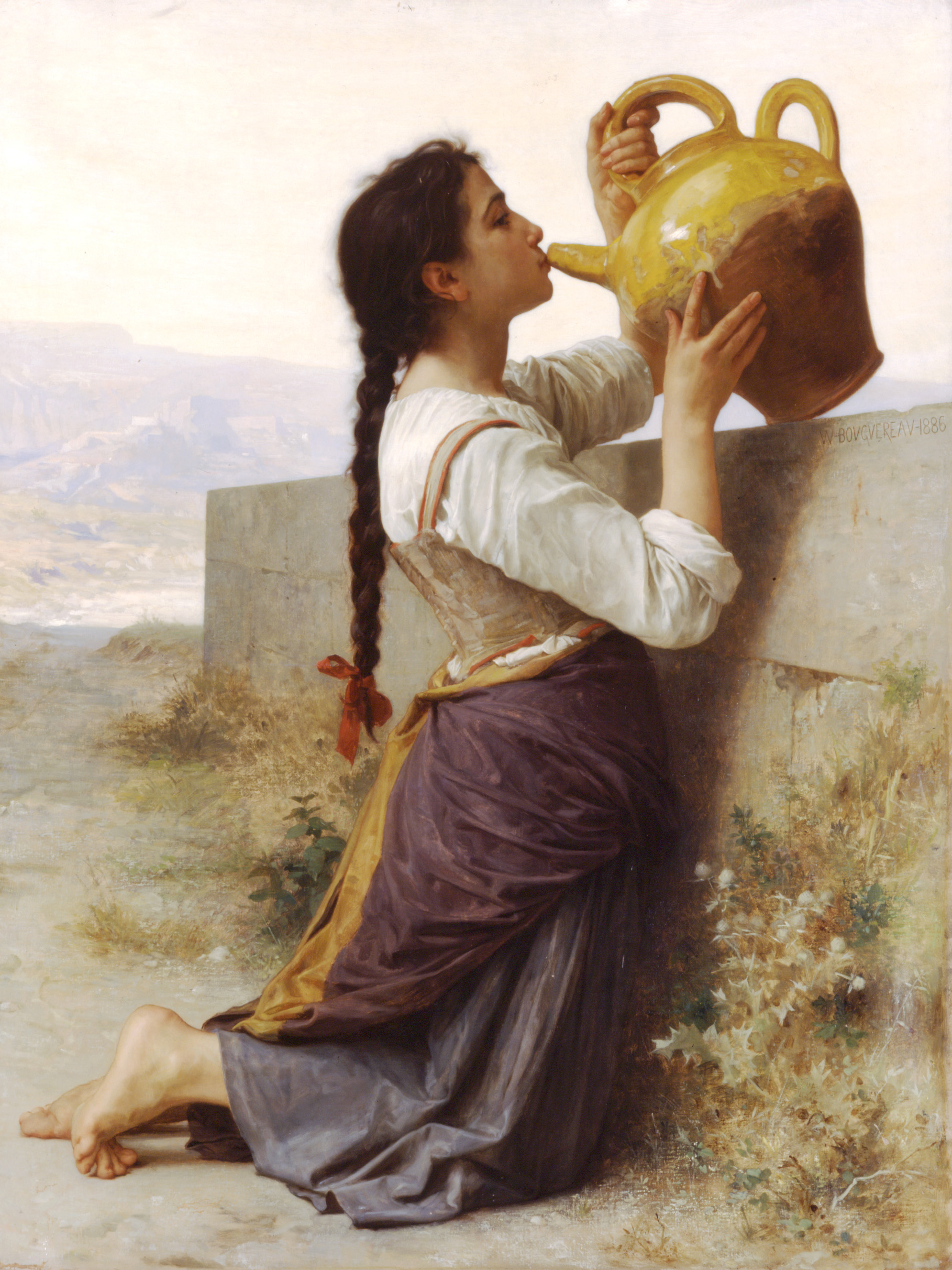
Thirst (1886), by William-Adolphe Bouguereau

Thirst is the craving for potable fluids, resulting in the basic instinct of animals to drink. It is an essential mechanism involved in fluid balance. It arises from a lack of fluids or an increase in the concentration of certain osmolytes, such as sodium. If the water volume of the body falls below a certain threshold or the osmolyte concentration becomes too high, structures in the brain detect changes in blood constituents and signal thirst.

Continuous dehydration can cause acute and chronic diseases, but is most often associated with renal and neurological disorders. Excessive thirst, called polydipsia, along with excessive urination, known as polyuria, may be an indication of diabetes mellitus or diabetes insipidus.

There are receptors and other systems in the body that detect a decreased fluid volume or an increased osmolyte concentration. Some sources distinguish "extracellular thirst" from "intracellular thirst", where extracellular thirst is thirst generated by decreased volume and intracellular thirst is thirst generated by increased osmolyte concentration.

== Detection ==
It is vital for organisms to be able to maintain their fluid levels within very narrow ranges. The goal is to keep the interstitial fluid, the fluid outside the cell, at the same concentration as the intracellular fluid, the fluid inside the cell. When the same levels of solutes are present on either side of the cell membrane, so that the net water movement is zero, the condition is called isotonic. If the interstitial fluid has a higher concentration of solutes (or a lower concentration of water) than the intracellular fluid, it will pull water out of the cell. This condition is called hypertonic and if enough water leaves the cell, it will not be able to perform essential chemical functions. The animal will then become thirsty in response to the demand for water in the cell. After the animal drinks water, the interstitial fluid becomes less concentrated of solutes (more concentrated of water) than the intracellular fluid and the cell will fill with water as it tries to equalize the concentrations. This condition is called hypotonic and can be dangerous because it can cause the cell to swell and rupture. One set of receptors responsible for thirst detects the concentration of interstitial fluid. The other set of receptors detects blood volume.

=== Decreased volume ===
This is one of two types of thirst and is defined as thirst caused by loss of blood volume (hypovolemia) without depleting the intracellular fluid. This can be caused by blood loss, vomiting, and diarrhea. This loss of volume is problematic because if the total blood volume falls too low the heart cannot circulate blood effectively and the eventual result is hypovolemic shock. The vascular system responds by constricting blood vessels thereby creating a smaller volume for the blood to fill. This mechanical solution, however, has definite limits and usually must be supplemented with increased volume. The loss of blood volume is detected by cells in the kidneys and triggers thirst for both water and salt via the renin-angiotensin system.

==== Renin-angiotensin system ====
Renin-angiotensin-aldosterone system

Hypovolemia leads to activation of the renin angiotensin system (RAS) and is detected by cells in the kidney. When these cells detect decreased blood flow due to the low volume they secrete an enzyme called renin. Renin then enters the blood where it catalyzes a protein called angiotensinogen to angiotensin I. Angiotensin I is then almost immediately converted by an enzyme already present in the blood to the active form of the protein, angiotensin II. Angiotensin II then travels in the blood until it reaches the posterior pituitary gland and the adrenal cortex, where it causes a cascade effect of hormones that cause the kidneys to retain water and sodium, increasing blood pressure. It is also responsible for the initiation of drinking behavior and salt appetite via the subfornical organ.

==== Others ====
- Arterial baroreceptors sense a decreased arterial pressure, and signal to the central nervous system in the area postrema and nucleus tractus solitarii.
- Cardiopulmonary receptors sense a decreased blood volume, and signal to area postrema and nucleus tractus solitarii.

=== Cellular dehydration and osmoreceptor stimulation ===
Osmometric thirst occurs when the solute concentration of the interstitial fluid increases. This increase draws water out of the cells, and they shrink in volume. The solute concentration of the interstitial fluid increases by high intake of sodium in diet or by the drop in volume of extracellular fluids (such as blood plasma and cerebrospinal fluid) due to loss of water through perspiration, respiration, urination and defecation. The increase in interstitial fluid solute concentration causes water to migrate from the cells of the body, through their membranes, to the extracellular compartment, by osmosis, thus causing cellular dehydration.

Clusters of cells (osmoreceptors) in the organum vasculosum of the lamina terminalis (OVLT) and subfornical organ (SFO), which lie outside of the blood brain barrier can detect the concentration of blood plasma and the presence of angiotensin II in the blood. They can then activate the median preoptic nucleus which initiates water seeking and ingestive behavior. Destruction of this part of the hypothalamus in humans and other animals results in partial or total loss of desire to drink even with extremely high salt concentration in the extracellular fluids. In addition, there are visceral osmoreceptors which project to the area postrema and nucleus tractus solitarii in the brain.

=== Salt craving ===
Because sodium is also lost from the plasma in hypovolemia, the body's need for salt proportionately increases in addition to thirst in such cases. This is also a result of the renin-angiotensin system activation.

=== Elderly ===
In adults over the age of 50 years, the body's thirst sensation reduces and continues diminishing with age, putting this population at increased risk of dehydration. Several studies have demonstrated that elderly persons have lower total water intakes than younger adults, and that women are particularly at risk of too low an intake. In 2009, the European Food Safety Authority (EFSA) included water as a macronutrient in its dietary reference values for the first time. Recommended intake volumes in the elderly are the same as for younger adults (2.0 L/day for females and 2.5 L/day for males) as despite lower energy consumption, the water requirement of this group is increased due to a reduction in renal concentrating capacity.

== Thirst quenching ==
According to preliminary research, quenching of thirst – the homeostatic mechanism to stop drinking – occurs via two neural phases: a "preabsorptive" phase which signals quenched thirst many minutes before fluid is absorbed from the stomach and distributed to the body via the circulation, and a "postabsorptive" phase which is regulated by brain structures sensing to terminate fluid ingestion. The preabsorptive phase relies on sensory inputs in the mouth, pharynx, esophagus, and upper gastrointestinal tract to anticipate the amount of fluid needed, providing rapid signals to the brain to terminate drinking when the assessed amount has been consumed. The postabsorptive phase occurs via blood monitoring for osmolality, fluid volume, and sodium balance, which are collectively sensed in brain circumventricular organs linked via neural networks to terminate thirst when fluid balance is established.

Thirst quenching varies among animal species, with dogs, camels, sheep, goats, and deer replacing fluid deficits quickly when water is available, whereas humans and horses may need hours to restore fluid balance.

== Neurophysiology ==
The areas of the brain that contribute to the sense of thirst are mainly located in the midbrain and the hindbrain. Specifically, the hypothalamus appears to play a key role in the regulation of thirst.

The area postrema and nucleus tractus solitarii signal to the subfornical organ and to the lateral parabrachial nucleus. The latter signaling relies on the neurotransmitter serotonin. The signal from the lateral parabrachial nucleus is relayed to the median preoptic nucleus.

The median preoptic nucleus and the subfornical organ receive signals of decreased volume and increased osmolyte concentration. Finally, the signals are received in cortex areas of the forebrain where thirst arises. The subfornical organ and the organum vasculosum of the lamina terminalis contribute to regulating the overall bodily fluid balance by signalling to the hypothalamus to form vasopressin, which is later released by the pituitary gland.

== See also ==
- Drought
- Hunger (motivational state)
- World Water Day
- Adipsia
