= Lamina terminalis =

Thin layer that forms the median portion of the wall of the forebrain

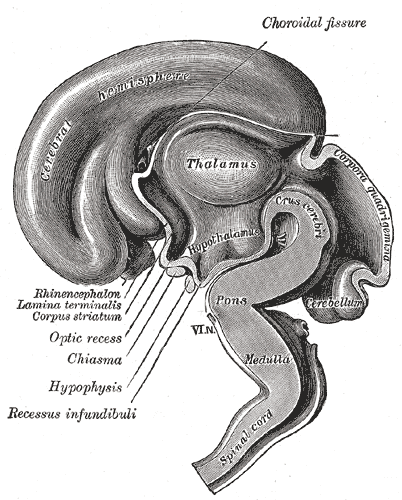
- Median sagittal section of brain of human embryo of three months. (Lamina terminalis labeled at center left.)

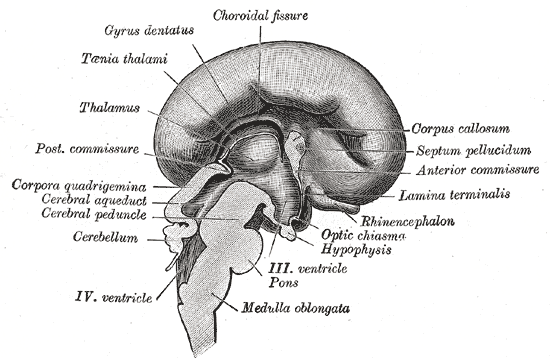
- Median sagittal section of brain of human embryo of four months. (Lamina terminalis labeled at center right.)

Details

Identifiers
- Latin: lamina terminalis
- NeuroNames: 208
- TA98: A14.1.08.419
- TA2: 5776
- FMA: 61975

The lamina terminalis is a thin layer that forms the median portion of the wall of the forebrain. It stretches from the interventricular foramen (foramen of Monro) to the recess at the base of the optic stalk (optic nerve) and contains the vascular organ of the lamina terminalis, which regulates the osmotic concentration of the blood. The lamina terminalis is immediately anterior to the tuber cinereum; together they form the pituitary stalk.

The lamina terminalis can be opened via endoscopic neurosurgery in an attempt to create a path that cerebrospinal fluid can flow through when a person has hydrocephalus and when it is not possible to perform an endoscopic third ventriculostomy, but the effectiveness of this technique is not certain.

This is the rostral end (tip) of the neural tube (embryological central nervous system) in the early weeks of development. Failure of the lamina terminalis to close properly at this stage of development will result in anencephaly or meroencephaly.

== Additional images ==
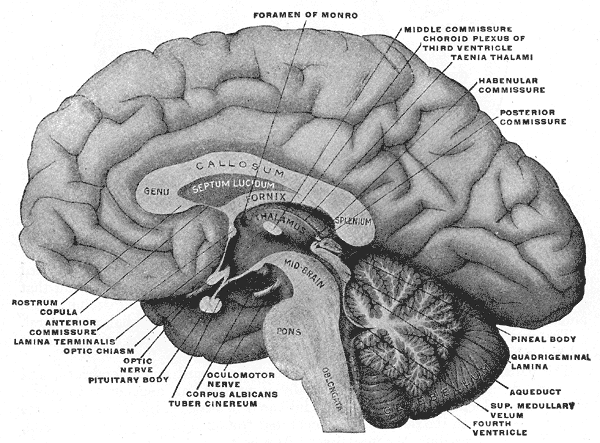
Mesal aspect of a brain sectioned in the median sagittal plane.

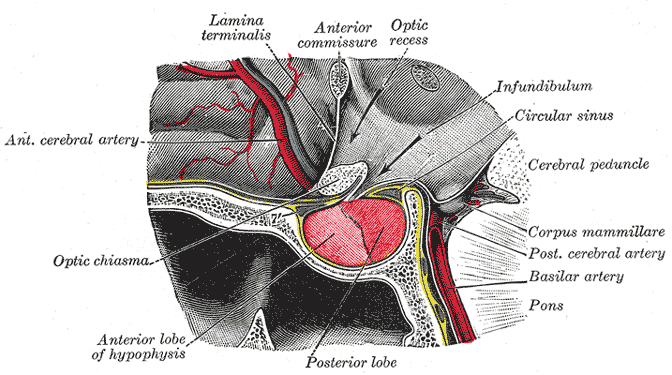
The pituitary gland in position. Shown in sagittal section.

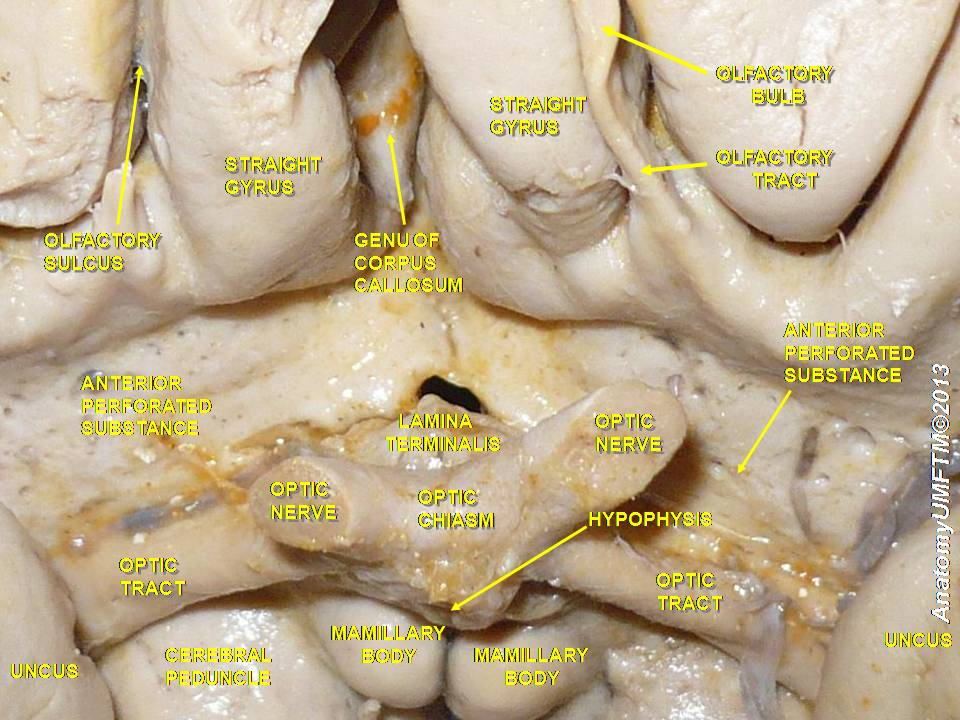
Cerebrum. Inferior view. Deep dissection

== See also ==
- Hypothalamus
- Vascular organ of lamina terminalis
- Cistern of lamina terminalis
