= Preoptic area =

Region of the anterior hypothalamus

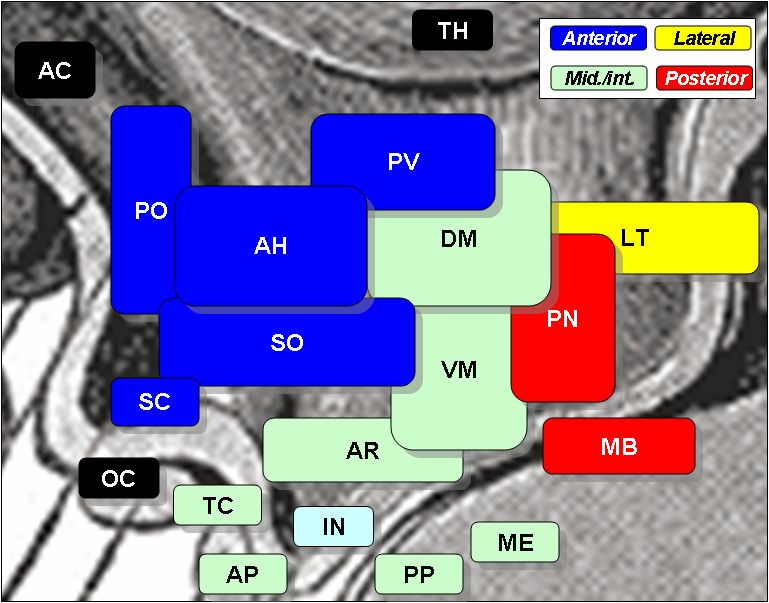
- Preoptic area is 'PO', at left, in blue.
- Preoptic area of the mouse brain

Details

Identifiers
- Latin: area praeoptica
- Acronym: POA
- MeSH: D011301
- NeuroNames: 377
- NeuroLex ID: birnlex_1706
- TA98: A14.1.08.407
- TA2: 5710
- FMA: 62313

The preoptic area is a region of the hypothalamus. MeSH classifies it as part of the anterior hypothalamus. TA lists four nuclei in this region, (medial, median, lateral, and periventricular).

== Functions ==
The preoptic area is responsible for thermoregulation and receives nervous stimulation from thermoreceptors in the skin, mucous membranes, and hypothalamus itself.

== Nuclei ==
=== Median preoptic nucleus ===
The median preoptic nucleus is located along the midline in a position significantly dorsal to the other three preoptic nuclei, at least in the crab-eating macaque brain. It wraps around the top (dorsal), front, and bottom (ventral) surfaces of the anterior commissure.

The median preoptic nucleus generates thirst. Drinking decreases noradrenaline release in the median preoptic nucleus.

=== Medial preoptic nucleus ===
The medial preoptic nucleus is bounded laterally by the lateral preoptic nucleus, and medially by the preoptic periventricular nucleus. It releases gonadotropin-releasing hormone (GnRH), controls copulation in males, and is larger in males than in females.

==== Parental behavior ====
The medial preoptic area (mPOA) has been implicated in parental care in both males and females. In rats, oxytocin and vasopressin are associated with maintaining maternal care through local release in the mPOA and the adjacent bed nucleus of the stria terminalis (BNST). Oxytocin and vasopressin V1a receptor binding are increased in both the mPOA and the BNST in lactating rats when compared to controls. The mPOA also has a high density of estradiol receptors that, when activated, can cause a male rat to show maternal-type behaviors. Additionally, the mPOA is critical for the onset and expression of parental behavior, as evidenced by increases in the immediate early gene c-fos, in experienced rat mothers or fathers when compared to controls. Also in fathers, studies have shown that when they receive ultrasonic or pheromone cues from their mates, their c-fos expression in the mPOA further increased, suggestive that rat paternal behavior is mediated through the mPOA but activated by direct interactions with a mate. Large lesions of the mPOA disrupt the onset of maternal behavior, nest-building, and pup retrieval, with the lateral projections being especially critical.

==== Sexual behavior ====
The mPOA is sexually dimorphic, that is, it differs in function between males and females. In females, studies have examined the influence of the mPOA on precopulatory and appetitive behaviors. Precopulatory behaviors involve several brain areas, including the mPOA as well as the medial amygdala (MA) and BNST. Studies using female Syrian hamsters have shown that the mPOA is important for sexual odor preference. While control females will investigate male odors more than female odors, those with bilateral lesions to the mPOA (MPOA-X) will show no difference in odor preference, but vaginal scent marking and lordosis remained unaffected. Appetitive behaviors of female rats – including hops, darts, and solicitations – have been linked to dopamine (DA) transmission in the mPOA. Since ascorbic acid (Vitamin C) enhances DA transmission in mesolimbic and nigrostriatal pathways, it has been shown that infusions of ascorbic acid into the mPOA increases appetitive behaviors compared to controls.

In male rats, the mPOA affects the consummatory phase of sexual behavior, and possibly motivation, with lesions causing a complete loss of copulatory behaviors. Conversely, electrical stimulation of this area triggers male copulatory behavior, as measured by decreases in the latency to ejaculate. Furthermore, testosterone implanted into the mPOA of castrated males completely restores mating, as long as aromatase is not inhibited.

=== Ventrolateral preoptic nucleus ===
The ventrolateral preoptic nucleus, or intermediate nucleus, is adjacent to the medial preoptic nucleus. It also mediates non-REM sleep onset.

=== Preoptic periventricular nucleus ===
The preoptic periventricular nucleus is located along the midline and is medial to the medial preoptic nucleus.
