= Angina =

Chest discomfort due to disorder of the heart muscles

- Other names: Stenocardia, angina pectoris
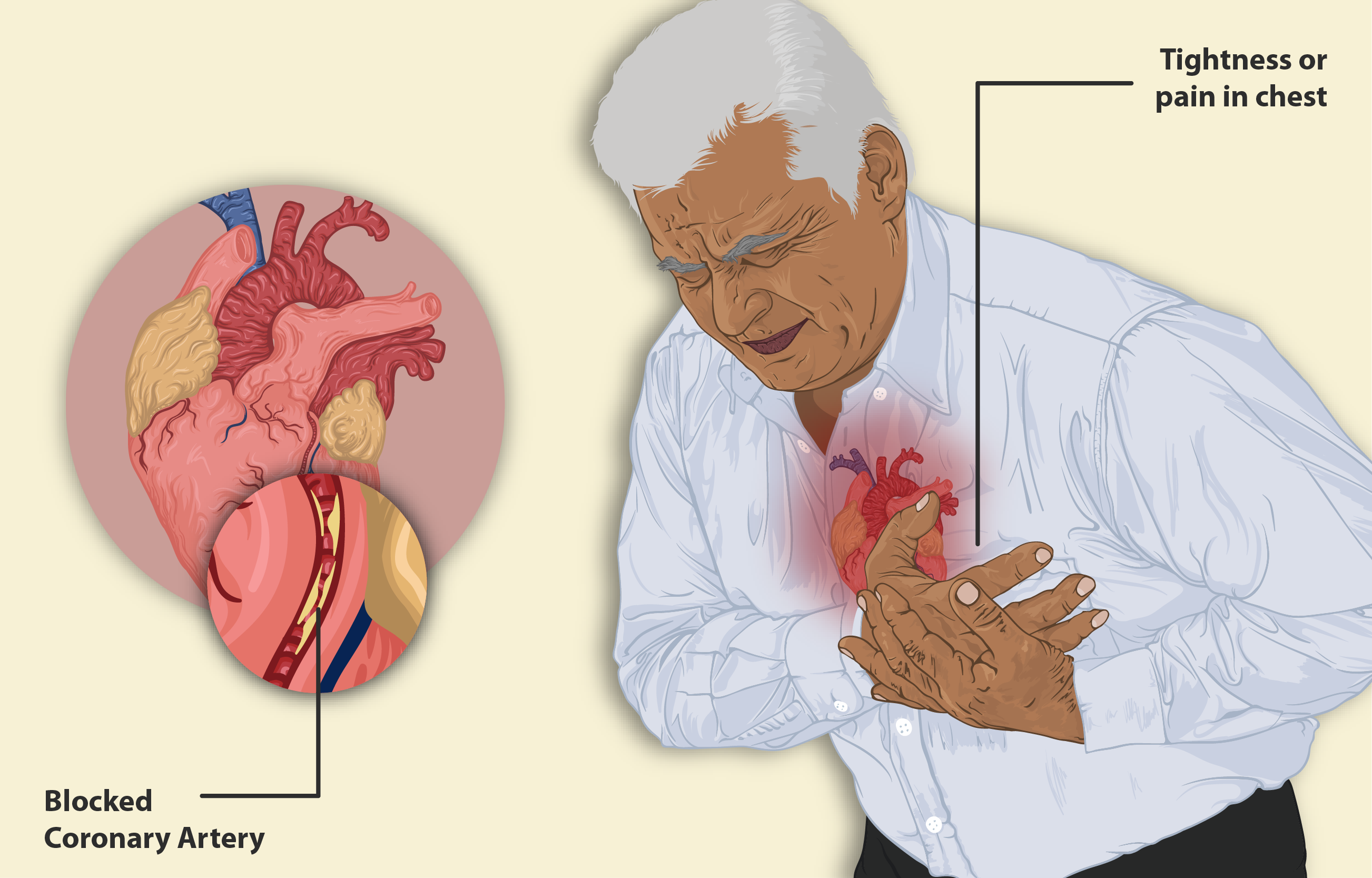
- Illustration depicting angina
- Pronunciation: /ænˈdʒaɪnə, ˈændʒɪnə/ ann-JY-nə, AN-jin-ə
- Specialty: Cardiology
- Complications: Myocardial infarction, unstable angina

Angina, in full angina pectoris, is chest pain or pressure, usually caused by insufficient blood flow to the heart muscle (myocardium). It is most commonly a symptom of coronary artery disease.

Angina is typically the result of partial obstruction or spasm of the arteries that supply blood to the heart muscle. The main mechanism of coronary artery obstruction is atherosclerosis as part of coronary artery disease. Other causes of angina include abnormal heart rhythms, heart failure and, less commonly, anemia. The term derives from Latin angere 'to strangle' and pectus 'chest', and can therefore be translated as "a strangling feeling in the chest".

An urgent medical assessment is suggested to rule out serious medical conditions. There is a relationship between severity of angina and degree of oxygen deprivation in the heart muscle. However, the severity of angina does not always match the degree of oxygen deprivation to the heart or the risk of a heart attack (myocardial infarction). Some people may experience severe pain even though there is little risk of a heart attack whilst others may have a heart attack and experience little or no pain. In some cases, angina can be quite severe. Worsening angina attacks, sudden-onset angina at rest, and angina lasting more than 15 minutes are symptoms of unstable angina (usually grouped with similar conditions as the acute coronary syndrome). As these may precede a heart attack, they require urgent medical attention and are, in general, treated similarly to heart attacks.

In the early 20th century, severe angina was seen as a sign of impending death. However, modern medical therapies have improved the outlook substantially. Middle-age patients who experience moderate to severe angina (grading by classes II, III, and IV) have a five-year survival rate of approximately 92%.

== Classification ==
=== Stable angina ===
Also known as 'effort angina', this refers to the classic type of angina related to myocardial ischemia. A typical presentation of stable angina is that of chest discomfort and associated symptoms precipitated by some activity (running, walking, etc.) with minimal or non-existent symptoms at rest or after administration of sublingual nitroglycerin. Symptoms typically diminish several minutes after activity and recur when activity resumes. In this way, stable angina may be thought of as being similar to intermittent claudication symptoms. Other recognized precipitants of stable angina include cold weather, heavy meals, and emotional stress.

=== Unstable angina ===
Unstable angina (UA) (also "crescendo angina"; this is a form of acute coronary syndrome) is defined as angina pectoris that changes or worsens or begins suddenly at rest. Unstable angina is a medical emergency and requires urgent medical treatment from a doctor.

It has at least one of these three features:

1. it occurs at rest (or with minimal exertion), usually lasting more than 10 minutes
2. it is severe and of new-onset (i.e., within the prior 4–6 weeks)
3. it occurs with a crescendo pattern (i.e., distinctly more severe, prolonged, or frequent than before).

UA may occur often unpredictably and even at rest, which may be a serious indicator of an impending heart attack. The primary factor differentiating unstable angina from stable angina (other than symptoms) is the underlying pathophysiology of the atherosclerosis. The pathophysiology of unstable angina is the reduction of coronary blood flow due to transient platelet aggregation on apparently normal endothelium, coronary artery spasms, or coronary thrombosis.

The process starts with atherosclerosis, progresses through inflammation to yield an active unstable plaque, which undergoes thrombosis and results in acute myocardial ischemia, which, if not reversed, results in cell necrosis (infarction). Studies show that 64% of all unstable anginas occur between 22:00 and 08:00 when patients are at rest.

In stable angina, the developing atheroma (a fatty plaque) is protected with a fibrous cap. This cap may rupture in unstable angina, allowing blood clots to precipitate and further decrease the area of the coronary vessel's lumen or the interior open space within an artery. This explains why, in many cases, unstable angina develops independently of activity.

=== Microvascular angina ===
Microvascular angina, also known as cardiac syndrome X, is characterized by angina-like chest pain, in the context of normal epicardial coronary arteries (the largest vessels on the surface of the heart, prior to significant branching) on angiography. The original definition of cardiac syndrome X also mandated that ischemic changes on exercise (despite normal coronary arteries) were displayed, as shown on cardiac stress tests. The primary cause of microvascular angina is unknown, but factors apparently involved are endothelial dysfunction and reduced flow (perhaps due to spasm) in the tiny "resistance" blood vessels of the heart. Since microvascular angina is not characterized by major arterial blockages, it is harder to recognize and diagnose.

Microvascular angina was previously considered a rather benign condition, but more recent data has changed this attitude. Studies, including the Women's Ischemia Syndrome Evaluation (WISE), suggest that microvascular angina is part of the pathophysiology of ischemic heart disease, perhaps explaining the higher rates of angina in females than in males, as well as their predilection towards ischemia and acute coronary syndromes in the absence of obstructive coronary artery disease.

== Signs and symptoms ==
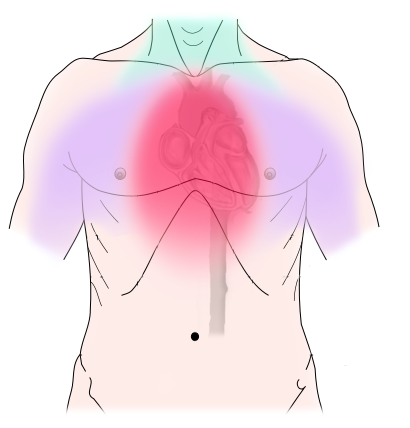
Diagram of discomfort caused by coronary artery disease. Pressure, fullness, squeezing or pain in the center of the chest. Discomfort can also be felt in the neck, jaw, shoulders, back or arms.

Angina pectoris can be quite painful, but many patients with angina complain of chest discomfort rather than actual pain: the discomfort is usually described as a pressure, heaviness, tightness, squeezing, burning, or choking sensation. Apart from chest discomfort, anginal pains may also be experienced in the epigastrium (upper central abdomen), back, neck area, jaw, or shoulders. This is explained by the concept of referred pain and is because the spinal level that receives visceral sensation from the heart simultaneously receives cutaneous sensation from parts of the skin specified by that spinal nerve's dermatome, without an ability to discriminate the two. Typical locations for referred pain are arms (often inner left arm), shoulders, and neck into the jaw. Angina is typically precipitated by exertion or emotional stress. It is exacerbated by having a full stomach and by cold temperatures. Pain may be accompanied by breathlessness, sweating, and nausea in some cases. In this case, the pulse rate and the blood pressure increases. Chest pain lasting only a few seconds is normally not angina (such as precordial catch syndrome).

Myocardial ischemia comes about when the myocardium (the heart muscle) receives insufficient blood and oxygen to function normally either because of increased oxygen demand by the myocardium or because of decreased supply to the myocardium. This inadequate perfusion of blood and the resulting reduced delivery of oxygen and nutrients are directly correlated to blocked or narrowed blood vessels.

Some experience "autonomic symptoms" (related to increased activity of the autonomic nervous system) such as nausea, vomiting, and pallor.

A variant form of angina—Prinzmetal's angina—occurs in patients with normal coronary arteries or insignificant atherosclerosis. It is believed caused by spasms of the artery. It occurs more in younger women.

Coital angina, also known as angina d'amour, is angina subsequent to sexual intercourse. It is generally rare, except in patients with severe coronary artery disease.

== Cause ==
=== Major risk factors ===
- Age
- Alcoholic beverages
- Smoking
- Diabetes mellitus
- Dyslipidemia
- Family history of premature cardiovascular disease
- Hypertension
- Kidney disease (microalbuminuria or GFR<60 mL/min)
- Obesity (BMI ≥ 30 kg/m2)
- Physical inactivity
- Prolonged psychosocial stress

Routine counseling of adults by physicians to advise them to improve their diet and increase their physical activity has, in general, been found to induce only small changes in actual behavior. Therefore, as of 2012, the U.S. Preventive Services Task Force does not recommend routine lifestyle counseling of all patients without known cardiovascular disease, hypertension, hyperlipidemia, or diabetes, and instead recommends selectively counseling only those patients who seem most ready to make lifestyle changes and using available time with other patients to explore other types of intervention that would be more likely to have a preventative impact.

Conditions that exacerbate or provoke angina

- Medications
  - Vasodilators
  - Excessive thyroid hormone replacement
- Vasoconstrictors
- Polycythemia, which thickens the blood, slowing its flow through the heart muscle
- Hypothermia
- Hypervolemia
- Hypovolemia

One study found that smokers with coronary artery disease had a significantly increased level of sympathetic nerve activity when compared to those without. This is in addition to increases in blood pressure, heart rate, and peripheral vascular resistance associated with nicotine, which may lead to recurrent angina attacks. In addition, the Centers for Disease Control and Prevention (CDC) reports that the risk of CHD (Coronary heart disease), stroke, and PVD (Peripheral vascular disease) is reduced within 1–2 years of smoking cessation. In another study, it was found that, after one year, the prevalence of angina in smoking males under 60 after an initial attack was 40% less in those having quit smoking compared to those that continued. Studies have found that there are short-term and long-term benefits to smoking cessation.

=== Other medical problems ===
- Esophageal disorders
- Gastroesophageal reflux disease (GERD)
- Hyperthyroidism
- Hypoxemia
- Profound anemia
- Uncontrolled hypertension

=== Other cardiac problems ===
- Bradyarrhythmia
- Hypertrophic cardiomyopathy
- Tachyarrhythmia
- Valvular heart disease

Myocardial ischemia can result from:

1. a reduction of blood flow to the heart that can be caused by stenosis, spasm, or acute occlusion (by an embolus) of the heart's arteries.
2. resistance of the blood vessels. This can be caused by narrowing of the blood vessels; a decrease in radius. Blood flow is proportional to the radius of the artery to the fourth power.
3. reduced oxygen-carrying capacity of the blood, due to several factors such as a decrease in oxygen tension and hemoglobin concentration. This decreases the ability of hemoglobin to carry oxygen to myocardial tissue.

Atherosclerosis is the most common cause of stenosis (narrowing of the blood vessels) of the heart's arteries and, hence, angina pectoris. Some people with chest pain have normal or minimal narrowing of heart arteries; in these patients, vasospasm is a more likely cause for the pain, sometimes in the context of Prinzmetal's angina and syndrome X.

Myocardial ischemia also can be the result of factors affecting blood composition, such as the reduced oxygen-carrying capacity of blood, as seen with severe anemia (low number of red blood cells), or long-term smoking.

== Pathophysiology ==
Angina results when there is an imbalance between the heart's oxygen demand and supply. This imbalance can result from an increase in demand (e.g., during exercise) without a proportional increase in supply (e.g., due to obstruction or atherosclerosis of the coronary arteries).

However, the pathophysiology of angina in females varies significantly as compared to males. Non-obstructive coronary disease is more common in females.

== Diagnosis ==
Angina should be suspected in people presenting tight, dull, or heavy chest discomfort that is:

1. Retrosternal or left-sided, radiating to the left arm, neck, jaw, or back.
2. Associated with exertion or emotional stress and relieved within several minutes by rest.
3. Precipitated by cold weather or a meal.

Some people present with atypical symptoms, including breathlessness, nausea, or epigastric discomfort, or burning. These atypical symptoms are particularly likely in older people, women, and those with diabetes.

Anginal pain is not usually sharp or stabbing or influenced by respiration. Antacids and simple analgesics do not usually relieve the pain. If chest discomfort (of whatever site) is precipitated by exertion, relieved by rest, and relieved by glyceryl trinitrate, the likelihood of angina is increased.

In angina patients momentarily not feeling any chest pain, an electrocardiogram (ECG) is typically normal unless there have been other cardiac problems in the past. During periods of pain, depression, or elevation of the ST segment may be observed. To elicit these changes, an exercise ECG test ("treadmill test") may be performed, during which the patient exercises to his/her maximum ability before fatigue, breathlessness, or pain intervenes; if characteristic ECG changes are documented (typically more than 1 mm of flat or downsloping ST depression), the test is considered diagnostic for angina. Even constant monitoring of the blood pressure and the pulse rate can lead to some conclusions regarding angina. The exercise test is also useful in looking for other markers of myocardial ischemia: blood pressure response (or lack thereof, in particular, a drop in systolic blood pressure), dysrhythmia, and chronotropic response. Other alternatives to a standard exercise test include a thallium scintigram or sestamibi scintigram (in patients unable to exercise enough for the treadmill tests, e.g., due to asthma or arthritis or in whom the ECG is too abnormal at rest) or stress echocardiography.

In patients in whom such noninvasive testing is diagnostic, a coronary angiogram is typically performed to identify the nature of the coronary lesion, and whether this would be a candidate for angioplasty, coronary artery bypass graft (CABG), treatment only with medication, or other treatments. In hospitalized patients with unstable angina (or the newer term of "high-risk acute coronary syndromes"), those with resting ischaemic ECG changes or those with raised cardiac enzymes such as troponin may undergo coronary angiography directly.

== Treatment ==
Angina pectoris occurs as a result of coronary blood flow insufficiency in the face of increased oxygen demand. The principal goal in the prevention and relief of angina is to limit the oxygen requirement of the heart so it can meet the inadequate oxygen supply derived through the blood supplied from the stenosed or constricted arteries. The main goals of treatment in angina pectoris are relief of symptoms, slowing progression of the disease, and reduction of future events, especially heart attacks and death. Beta blockers (e.g., carvedilol, metoprolol, propranolol) have a large body of evidence in morbidity and mortality benefits (fewer symptoms, less disability, and longer life) and short-acting nitroglycerin medications have been used since 1879 for symptomatic relief of angina. There are differing course of treatments for the patient depending on the type of angina the patient has. However, this second can provide a brief overview of the types of medications provided for angina and the purpose by which they are prescribed.

Beta blockers, specifically B1 adrenergic blockers without intrinsic sympathomimetic activity, are preferred for angina treatment, out of B1 selective and non-selective as well as B1 ISA agents. B1 blockers are cardioselective blocking agents (such as nevibolol, atenolol, metoprolol, bisoprolol, etc.) which result in blocking cAMP in the heart muscle cells. cAMP, which plays a vital role in phosphorylating the ryanodine receptor and LTCC, will usually increase Ca^{+2} levels in the heart muscle cells, blocking contraction. Therefore, B1 blockade decreases the HR and contraction of the heart muscle, making it demand less oxygen. An important thing to note is that the B1 cardioselective blockers are cardioselective and not cardio-specific. This means that if the beta-adrenergic antagonist is prescribed in higher doses, it can lose the selectivity aspect and begin causing hypertension from B2 adrenergic stimulation of smooth muscle cells. This is why in therapy for patients with angina, the vasodilatory organonitrates complement the use of B-blockers when prescribed the use of angina. The preference for Beta-1 cardioselective blockers is for B1 cardioselective blockers without intrinsic sympathetic activity. Beta blockers with intrinsic sympathetic activity will still do the beta blockade of the heart muscle cells and have a decreased ionotrophic and chronotropic effect, but this effect will be to a lesser extent than if the beta blocker did not have the intrinsic sympathetic activity. A common beta-blocker with ISA prescribed for the treatment of angina is Acebutolol.

Non-selective beta-adrenergic antagonists will yield the same action on B1 receptors, however will also act on B2 receptors. These medications, such as Propranolol and Nadolol, act on B1 receptors on smooth muscle cells as well. B1 blockade occurs in the smooth muscle cells. Specifically cAMP is responsible for inhibiting Myosin Light Kinase, the enzyme responsible for acting on Actin-Myosin. The inhibition of B1 will result in decreased levels of cAMP which will lead to increased levels of Myosin Light Chain Kinase in the smooth muscle cells, the enzyme responsible for acting on Actin-Myosin and leading to contraction of the smooth muscle cell. This increased contraction of the smooth muscle cell from B1 blockade is not desirable since it explains the hypertension that may arise with patients taking that medication.

Calcium channel blockers act to decrease the heart's workload, and thus its requirement for oxygen by blocking the calcium channels of the heart muscle cell. With decreased intracellular calcium, the calcium-troponin complex does not form in the heart muscle cell and it does not contract, therefore reducing the need for oxygen.

The other class of medication that can be used to treat angina are the organic nitrates. Organic nitrates are used extensively to treat angina. They improve coronary blood flow of the coronary arteries (arteries which supply blood to the heart muscle) by reversing and preventing vasospasm, which increases the blood flow to the heart, improving perfusion and oxygen delivery to the heart associated with the pain of angina. These drugs also reduce systemic vascular resistance, of both veins and arteries but the veins to a greater extent. The decrease in the resistance of the arteries and veins decreases the myocardial oxygen demand, which also reduces myocardial oxygen demand. Nitroglycerin is a potent vasodilator that decreases myocardial oxygen demand by decreasing the heart's workload. Nitroglycerin should not be given if certain inhibitors such as sildenafil, tadalafil, or vardenafil have been taken within the previous 12 hours as the combination of the two could cause a serious drop in blood pressure.

Treatments for angina are balloon angioplasty, in which the balloon is inserted at the end of a catheter and inflated to widen the arterial lumen. Stents to maintain the arterial widening are often used at the same time. Coronary bypass surgery involves bypassing constricted arteries with venous grafts. This is much more invasive than angioplasty.

Calcium channel blockers (such as nifedipine (Adalat) and amlodipine), isosorbide mononitrate and nicorandil are vasodilators commonly used in chronic stable angina. A new therapeutic class, called If inhibitor, has recently been made available: Ivabradine provides heart rate reduction without affecting contractility leading to major anti-ischemic and antianginal efficacy. ACE inhibitors are also vasodilators with both symptomatic and prognostic benefit. Statins are the most frequently used lipid/cholesterol modifiers, which probably also stabilize existing atheromatous plaque. Low-dose aspirin decreases the risk of heart attack in patients with chronic stable angina, and was part of standard treatment. However, in patients without established cardiovascular disease, the increase in hemorrhagic stroke and gastrointestinal bleeding offsets any benefits and it is no longer advised unless the risk of myocardial infarction is very high.

Exercise is also a suitable long-term treatment for the angina (but only particular regimens – gentle and sustained exercise rather than intense short bursts), probably working by complex mechanisms such as improving blood pressure and promoting coronary artery collateralisation.

Though sometimes used by patients, evidence does not support the use of traditional Chinese herbal products (THCP) for angina.

Identifying and treating risk factors for further coronary heart disease is a priority in patients with angina. This means testing for elevated cholesterol and other fats in the blood, diabetes and hypertension (high blood pressure), and encouraging smoking cessation and weight optimization.

The calcium channel blocker nifedipine prolongs cardiovascular event- and procedure-free survival in patients with coronary artery disease. New overt heart failures were reduced by 29% compared to placebo; however, the mortality rate difference between the two groups was statistically insignificant.

=== Microvascular angina in women ===
Women with myocardial ischemia often have either no or atypical symptoms, such as palpitations, anxiety, weakness, and fatigue. Additionally, many females with angina are found to have cardiac ischemia, yet no evidence of obstructive coronary artery disease on cardiac catheterization. Evidence is accumulating that nearly half of females with myocardial ischemia have coronary microvascular disease, a condition often called microvascular angina (MVA). Small intramyocardial arterioles constrict in MVA causing ischemic pain that is less predictable than with typical epicardial coronary artery disease (CAD).

The pathophysiology is complex and still being elucidated, but there is strong evidence that endothelial dysfunction, decreased endogenous vasodilators, inflammation, changes in adipokines, and platelet activation are contributing factors. The diagnosis of MVA may require catheterization during which there is an assessment of the microcirculatory response to adenosine or acetylcholine and measurement of coronary and fractional flow reserve. New techniques include positron emission tomography (PET) scanning, cardiac magnetic resonance imaging (MRI), and transthoracic Doppler echocardiography.

Managing MVA can be challenging, for example, females with this condition have less coronary microvascular dilation in response to nitrates than do those without MVA. Females with MVA often have traditional risk factors for CAD such as obesity, dyslipidemia, diabetes, and hypertension. Aggressive interventions to reduce modifiable risk factors are an important component of management, especially smoking cessation, exercise, and diabetes management. The combination of non-nitrate vasodilators, such as calcium channel blockers and angiotensin-converting enzyme (ACE) inhibitors along with HMG-CoA reductase inhibitors (statins), also is effective in many women, and new drugs, such as Ranolazine and Ivabradine, have shown promise in the treatment of MVA. Other approaches include spinal cord stimulators, adenosine receptor blockade, and psychiatric intervention.

=== Suspected angina ===
Hospital admission for people with the following symptoms is recommended, as they may have unstable angina: pain at rest (which may occur at night), pain on minimal exertion, angina that seems to progress rapidly despite increasing medical treatment. All people with suspected angina should be urgently referred to a chest pain evaluation service, for confirmation of the diagnosis and assessment of the severity of coronary heart disease.

== Epidemiology ==
As of 2010, angina due to ischemic heart disease affects approximately 112 million people (1.6% of the global population) being slightly more common in males than females (1.7% to 1.5%).

In the United States, 10.2 million are estimated to experience angina with approximately 500,000 new cases occurring each year. Angina is more often the presenting symptom of coronary artery disease in females than in men. The prevalence of angina rises with increasing age, with a mean age of onset of 62.3 years. After five years post-onset, 4.8% of individuals with angina subsequently died from coronary heart disease. Males with angina were found to have an increased risk of subsequent acute myocardial infarction and coronary heart disease related death than women. Similar figures apply in the remainder of the Western world. All forms of coronary heart disease are much less-common in the Third World, as its risk factors are much more common in Western and Westernized countries; it could, therefore, be termed a disease of affluence.

== Prognosis ==
Angina may persist or recur after ballon angioplasty, a phenomenon called post-percutaneous intervention (PCI) angina. The prevalence of post-PCI angina is widely recognized to affect between 20% and 40% of patients during short-to-medium-term follow-up (Three months to One year). Other studies suggest that between 20% to 60% of patients continue to experience anginal symptoms after their procedure.

The pathophysiological landscape of post-PCI angina is multifactorial, involving a complex interplay between mechanical, functional, and patient-specific factors. These mechanisms are generally categorized into obstructive causes, such as incomplete revascularization (where flow-limiting lesions are left unaddressed) or stent failure (including restenosis and thrombosis), and non-obstructive causes, such as coronary microvascular dysfunction and vasomotor disorders like epicardial or microvascular spasms.

== History ==
The condition was named "hritshoola" in ancient India and was described by Sushruta (6th century BC).

The first clinical description of angina pectoris was by a British physician Dr. William Heberden in 1768. Heberden hypothesised that "there is a disorder of the breast marked with strong and peculiar symptoms, considerable for the kind of danger belonging to it, and not extremely rare, which deserves to be mentioned more at length." He noticed that sufferers typically had a painful sensation around the breast usually after eating or while walking. Heberden said that this "may make it not improperly be called angina pectoris" (because "Agina" comes from Greek ankhonē "a strangling" and "Pectoris" comes from Latin pectoralis "of the breast").
