= Philipp Schütz =

Swiss physician-scientist and endocrinologist

- Education: University of Basel; Harvard T.H. Chan School of Public Health
- Known for: Individualized nutritional therapy; procalcitonin-guided antibiotic stewardship
- Scientific career
- Fields: Internal medicine, endocrinology, clinical nutrition
- Workplaces: University of Basel; Kantonsspital Aarau
- Academic advisors: Nathan Shapiro

Philipp Schütz (also published as Schuetz) is a Swiss physician-scientist, internist, endocrinologist, and clinical researcher. He is professor of medicine and endocrinology at the University of Basel and department chief of medicine at Kantonsspital Aarau, a teaching hospital affiliated with the University of Basel. He heads the Departments of Internal Medicine and Family Medicine and of Endocrinology, Diabetes and Clinical Nutrition, and serves as chief research officer (CRO) as a member of the hospital board.

Schütz is internationally known for his work on individualized nutritional therapy in hospitalized patients and for contributions to biomarker-guided antibiotic stewardship, particularly procalcitonin-based decision strategies. He has authored more than 400 peer-reviewed publications in journals including The Lancet, JAMA, and Annals of Internal Medicine, with an h-index exceeding 95.

== Early life and education ==
Schütz studied medicine at the University of Basel from 1996 to 2002 and completed part of his training at the Université Paris-Sud (Kremlin-Bicêtre). He earned his medical doctorate in 2005 with a research thesis at the Institute for Medical Microbiology in Basel.

From 2003 to 2009, he completed residency training in internal medicine and endocrinology at institutions including St. Claraspital and the University Hospital Basel. In 2010, he obtained Swiss board certification in internal medicine and endocrinology. From 2009 to 2011, he undertook postdoctoral clinical research training at Beth Israel Deaconess Medical Center under Nathan Shapiro and completed a Master of Public Health at the Harvard T.H. Chan School of Public Health.

== Career ==
After returning to Switzerland, Schütz served as an attending physician and later senior consultant in internal medicine and endocrinology at Kantonsspital Aarau from 2011 to 2018. In January 2019, he was appointed Head (Chefarzt) of the Department of General Internal Medicine and Family Medicine.

Academically, he received his habilitation (venia docendi) from the University of Basel in 2012. He held a Swiss National Science Foundation Clinical Research Professorship from 2014 to 2020 and was appointed titular professor of medicine and endocrinology in 2019. His institutional responsibilities include chairing the hospital research council, leading the Nutrition Commission, and serving on multiple clinical and pharmaceutical oversight committees. He is a member of the hospital executive board with responsibility for research and education and serves as chief research officer.

== Research ==
Schütz's research focuses on improving outcomes for medical inpatients through evidence-based nutritional interventions, biomarker-guided antibiotic stewardship, endocrine and metabolic prognostication, and health-services research related to triage and care transitions.

He is principal investigator of the EFFORT programme, a series of multicentre studies evaluating protocol-guided, individualized nutritional support for hospitalized patients at risk of malnutrition. The pivotal EFFORT randomized clinical trial enrolled over 2,000 patients across eight Swiss hospitals and demonstrated reductions in complications and improvements in survival and functional outcomes among patients receiving individualized nutritional therapy.

Subsequent analyses examined cost-effectiveness, long-term outcomes, inflammatory modulation, and metabolomic correlates of nutritional response. These studies demonstrated that systemic inflammation, measured by C-reactive protein, modifies response to nutritional intervention, helping to explain heterogeneous findings in earlier critical-care nutrition trials. Schütz currently leads EFFORT II, extending nutritional interventions into the post-discharge setting.

Schütz has also been an investigator in biomarker-guided antibiotic stewardship, particularly using procalcitonin (PCT). He led the ProHOSP randomized trial and contributed to patient-level meta-analyses demonstrating that PCT-guided strategies reduce antibiotic exposure and were associated with reduced mortality and antibiotic-related adverse events in acute respiratory infections.

These analyses informed the U.S. Food and Drug Administration's 2017 expansion of cleared indications for PCT assays in lower respiratory tract infections and sepsis. His broader biomarker research includes endocrine and metabolic markers such as thyroid hormones, IGF-1, copeptin, and glucose metabolism.

In health-services research, Schütz has led projects including TRIAGE and InHospiTOOL, developing validated tools to optimize inpatient triage, discharge planning, and care transitions.

== Professional activities ==
Schütz serves as president of the Swiss Federal Nutrition Commission (Eidgenössische Ernährungskommission) and president of the Swiss Society for Clinical Nutrition and Metabolism (GESKES). He is active in multiple national scientific societies and regularly reviews manuscripts for journals including The New England Journal of Medicine, The Lancet, and Annals of Internal Medicine. He also serves as a grant reviewer for the Swiss National Science Foundation, the U.S. National Institutes of Health, and other international funding agencies.

== Awards ==
- Theodor Nägeli Prize (2022; awarded 2023)
- Swiss Society of General Internal Medicine Prize for Best Original Research (2019, 2021)

Over his career, Schütz has obtained more than CHF 8 million in competitive research funding.

== Selected publications ==
- Schuetz, P; et al. (2019). "Individualised nutritional support in medical inpatients at nutritional risk: a randomised clinical trial". The Lancet. 393 (10188): 2312–2321. doi:10.1016/S0140-6736(18)32776-4.
- Schuetz, P; et al. (2017). "Effect of procalcitonin-guided antibiotic treatment on mortality in acute respiratory infections: a patient-level meta-analysis". The Lancet Infectious Diseases. 17 (1): 95–107. doi:10.1016/S1473-3099(17)30592-3. hdl:11380/1148016. PMID 29037960.
- Schuetz, P; et al. (2009). "Effect of procalcitonin-based guidelines vs standard guidelines on antibiotic use in lower respiratory tract infections: the ProHOSP randomized controlled trial". JAMA. 302 (10): 1059–1066. doi:10.1001/jama.2009.1303. PMID 19738090.
- Schuetz, P; et al. (2019). "Association of nutritional support with clinical outcomes among medical inpatients who are malnourished or at nutritional risk: an updated systematic review and meta-analysis". JAMA Network Open. 2 (11): e1915138. doi:10.1001/jamanetworkopen.2019.15138. PMC 6902795. PMID 31747030.
- Schuetz, P; et al. (2019). "Procalcitonin-guided antibiotic treatment in patients with positive cultures: a patient-level meta-analysis of randomized trials". Clinical Infectious Diseases. 69 (3): 388–396. doi:10.1093/cid/ciy908.
- Schuetz, P; et al. (2020). "Economic evaluation of individualised nutritional support in medical inpatients: secondary analysis of the EFFORT trial". Clinical Nutrition. 39 (12): 3750–3755. doi:10.1016/j.clnu.2020.04.002. PMID 32471645.
