= AVP gene =

Gene

AVP
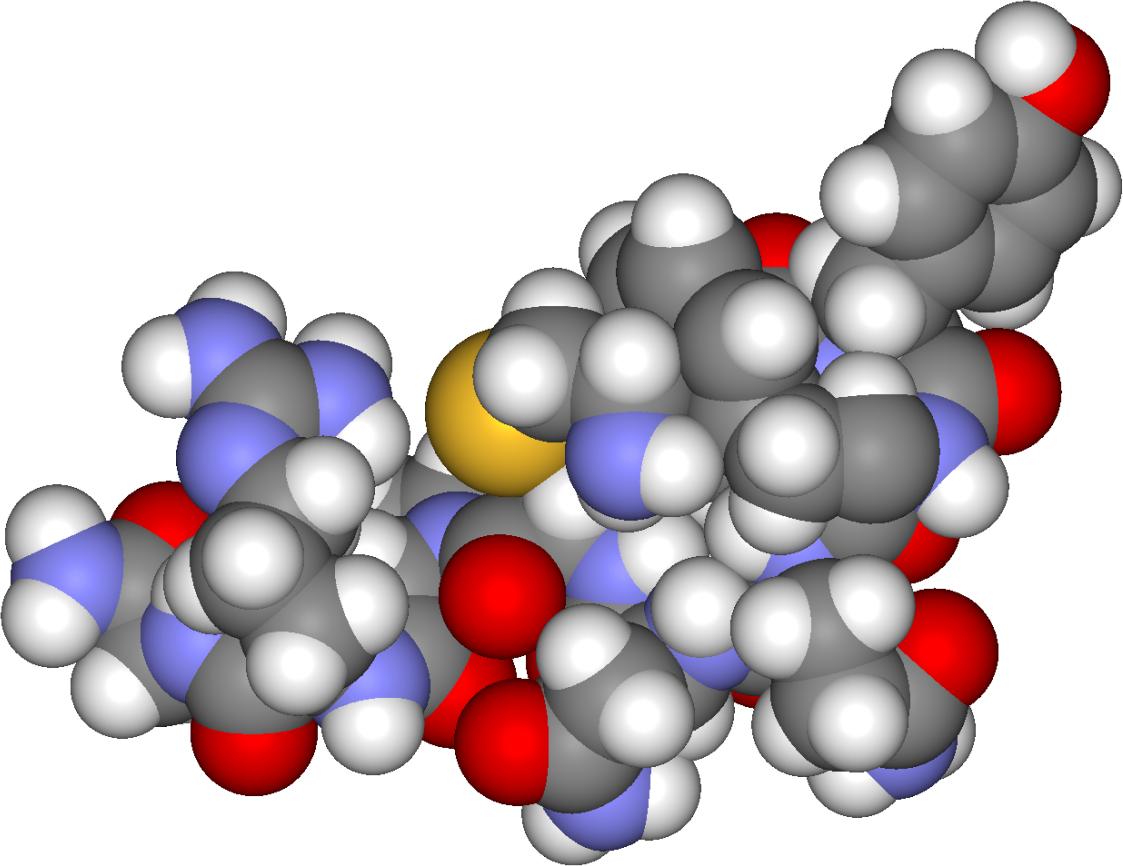

Identifiers
- Aliases: AVP, ADH, ARVP, AVP-NPII, AVRP, VP, AVP gene, AVP (gene), Prepro-AVP-NP II, arginine vasopressin gene, vasopressin gene, prepro-arginine-vasopressin-neurophysin II gene, vasopressin-neurophysin II-copeptin, vasopressin-neurophysin 2-copeptin, prepro-AVP2
- External IDs: OMIM: 192340; MGI: 88121; GeneCards: AVP

Gene location (Human)
Chr.	Chromosome 20 (human)
Band	20p13	Start	3,082,556 bp
Band	20p13	End	3,084,724 bp

Gene location (Mouse)
Chr.	Chromosome 2 (mouse)
Band	2 F1|2 63.24 cM	Start	130,422,540 bp
Band	2 F1|2 63.24 cM	End	130,424,474 bp
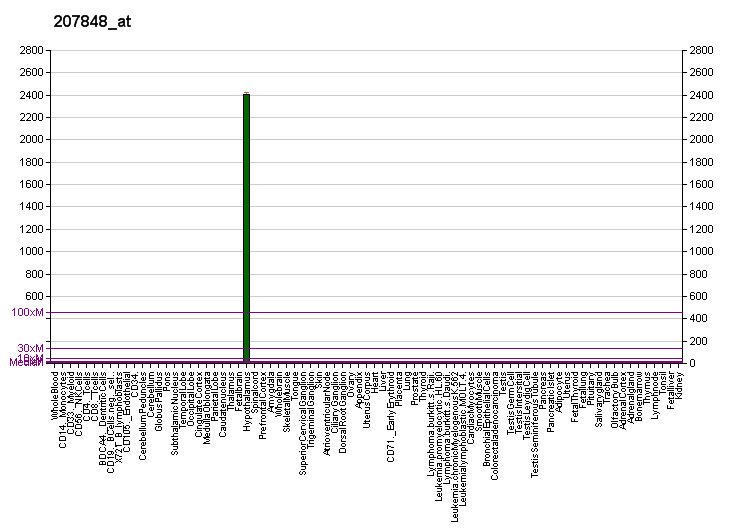
RNA expression pattern
Bgee	Human / Mouse (ortholog); Top expressed in: hypothalamus; internal globus pallidus; gastric mucosa; apex of heart; human kidney; monocyte; left testis; amygdala; anterior pituitary; right adrenal cortex / Top expressed in: paraventricular nucleus of hypothalamus; supraoptic nucleus; arcuate nucleus; optic nerve; median eminence; suprachiasmatic nucleus; nucleus of stria terminalis; ventromedial nucleus; lateral hypothalamus; hair; More reference expression data
BioGPS	More reference expression data
Gene ontology
Molecular function	protein kinase activity; hormone activity; cysteine-type endopeptidase inhibitor activity involved in apoptotic process; neurohypophyseal hormone activity; signaling receptor binding; V1A vasopressin receptor binding; V1B vasopressin receptor binding; neuropeptide hormone activity
Cellular component	extracellular region; cytosol; clathrin-coated vesicle membrane; extracellular space; secretory granule; dendrite
Biological process	negative regulation of cysteine-type endopeptidase activity involved in apoptotic process; vasoconstriction; negative regulation of release of cytochrome c from mitochondria; ERK1 and ERK2 cascade; water transport; cell-cell signaling; negative regulation of apoptotic process; protein kinase C signaling; generation of precursor metabolites and energy; positive regulation of peptidyl-serine phosphorylation; positive regulation of gene expression; renal water homeostasis; signal transduction; apoptotic process; membrane organization; regulation of signaling receptor activity; G protein-coupled receptor signaling pathway; maternal aggressive behavior; positive regulation of systemic arterial blood pressure; positive regulation of cytosolic calcium ion concentration; negative regulation of female receptivity; grooming behavior; locomotory behavior; positive regulation of cell population proliferation; positive regulation of glutamate secretion; response to organic cyclic compound; positive regulation of cell growth; positive regulation of prostaglandin biosynthetic process; positive regulation of cellular pH reduction; response to testosterone; response to nicotine; social behavior; regulation of renal sodium excretion; hyperosmotic salinity response; Maternal behavior; penile erection; response to ethanol; positive regulation of vasoconstriction; multicellular organismal water homeostasis; negative regulation of transmission of nerve impulse
Sources:Amigo / QuickGO
Orthologs
Databases	NCBI: entry; OMA: entry
Species	Human	Mouse
Entrez	551	11998
Ensembl	ENSG00000101200	ENSMUSG00000037727
UniProt	P01185	P35455
RefSeq (mRNA)	NM_000490	NM_009732
RefSeq (protein)	NP_000481	NP_033862
Location (UCSC)	Chr 20: 3.08 – 3.08 Mb	Chr 2: 130.42 – 130.42 Mb
PubMed search
- Wikidata
View/Edit Human	View/Edit Mouse

The arginine vasopressin (AVP) gene is a gene whose product is proteolytically cleaved to produce vasopressin (also known as antidiuretic hormone or ADH), neurophysin II, and a glycoprotein called copeptin. AVP and other AVP-like peptides are found in mammals, as well as mollusks, arthropods, nematodes, and other invertebrate species. In humans, AVP is present on chromosome 20 and plays a role in homeostatic regulation. The products of AVP have many functions that include vasoconstriction, regulating the balance of water in the body, and regulating responses to stress. Expression of AVP is regulated by the transcription translation feedback loop (TTFL), which is an important part of the circadian system that controls the expression of clock genes. AVP has important implications in the medical field as its products have significant roles throughout body.

preproAVP
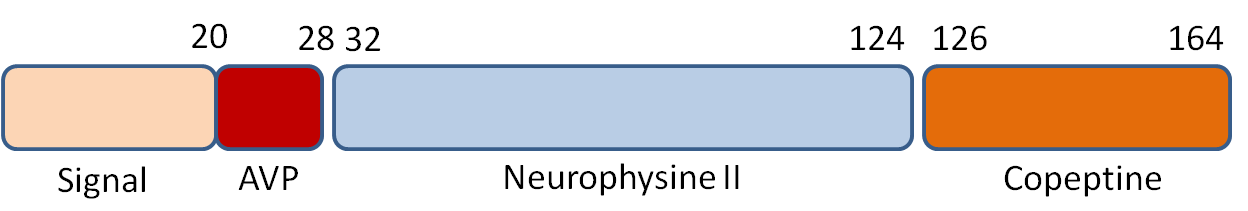
- Diagram of the pre-pro-AVP precursor showing position and size in amino acids of vasopressin, neurophysin II and copeptin

Identifiers
- Symbol: preproAVP
- OMIM: 192340
- UniProt: P01185

Other data
- Locus: Chr. 20 p13
Search for
- Structures: Swiss-model
- Domains: InterPro

== Discovery ==
=== Vasopressin ===
The discovery of the AVP gene first required the discovery of one of its key products: vasopressin. In 1895, G. Oliver and E.A. Schäfer found that a substance released by the pituitary gland could elevate blood pressure. The researchers noted that intravenous injection of extracts from the pituitary gland, thyroid gland, and spleen all influence blood pressure, however the effect from the pituitary had the most significant impact. Almost thirty years later, Kamm and colleagues separated the components within the pituitary gland. Using a unique, five-step separation technique, Kamm revealed one substance associated with uterine contractions – oxytocin – and another substance associated with blood pressure – vasopressin.

Once the discovery and separation of vasopressin occurred, subsequent research on the product's structure, function, and mode of generation could take place. In 1951, Turner and colleagues uncovered the amino acid sequence behind the hormone. The amino acid structure was composed of eight amino acids, including phenylalanine, tyrosine, proline, glutamic acid, aspartic acid, glycine, arginine, and cystine. The structure was also found to include ammonia. Following this discovery, Vincent du Vigneaud was able to synthesize a synthetic form of vasopressin in a laboratory setting. Du Vigneaud specifically noted that his final product had the same activity and composition ratios as that of naturally occurring vasopressin.

=== AVP gene ===
The work on vasopressin ultimately allowed researchers to work backwards and identify the gene responsible for this product's generation. This final stage of research began when Gainer and colleagues found a precursor protein to vasopressin in 1977. The structure of the protein was subsequently discovered by Land in 1982. By sequencing complementary DNA strands that encoded for the hormone's mRNA, Land outlined the amino acid sequence of the precursor protein. Finally, one year later, Schmale, Heinsohn, and Richter isolated the AVP precursor gene in rats from their genomic library. The researchers used restriction mapping and nucleotide sequence analysis to uncover the gene's three distinct exons and the products (vasopressin, neurophysin, and glycoprotein) that each was responsible for.

== Structure ==
The 1.85 kilobase-long AVP gene, located on chromosome 20 (20p13) contains three functional domains, including AVP, neurophysin II (NP) and a C-terminal glycopeptide called copeptin. Using restriction mapping and sequencing, the gene was found to have these domains which spanned over three exons with two intronic sequences. Exon A encodes a putative signal peptide, the arginine vasopressin hormone, and the N terminus of the NP carrier protein. Exon B, which is separated from exon A with a 1 kilobase-long intron, encodes the conserved middle portion of NP. A 227 kilobase intron separates exon B from exon C, which encodes the final domain, including the C terminus of NP and the glycoprotein. The structure of this gene has been found to be generally conserved across species, including chimpanzees, Rhesus monkeys, dogs, cows, mice, rats, chicken, zebrafish, and frogs.

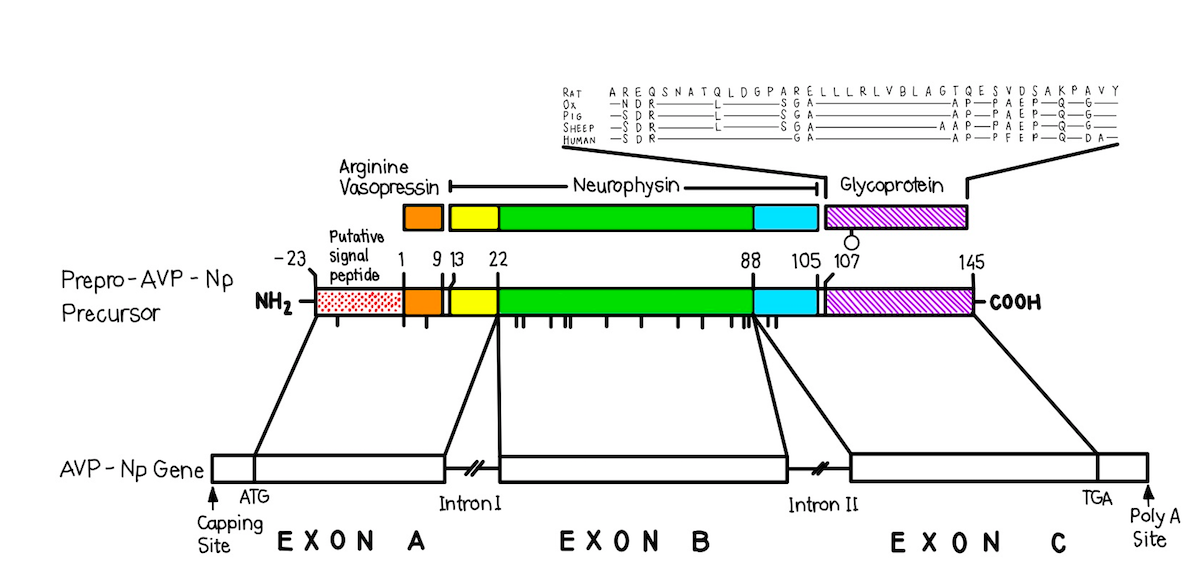
Visualization of the AVP gene structure

=== Promoter region ===
The AVP gene promoter region consists of an E-box element located 150 residues upstreams of the transcription start site, which binds mammalian clock proteins CLOCK and BMAL1 involved in generating circadian rhythms in the suprachiasmatic nucleus (SCN). BMAL1 and CLOCK gene knockouts in the SCN (Bmal^{-/-} and clk^{-/-}) eliminate rhythmicity in AVP mRNA expression, confirming that binding of the protein heterodimers to the E-box element is necessary for the intrinsic circadian pattern of the AVP gene. In addition to the E-box element, the promoter region of the AVP gene also contains a cyclic AMP (cAMP) response element (CRE) site that is involved in gene expression regulation. Daily rhythms in the phosphorylation of the CRE-binding protein (CREB) support a contribution of this element to circadian rhythmicity of the gene's expression. CRE/CREB-mediated regulation of the AVP gene is activated through the cAMP activation of Ras signaling pathways, culminating in the MAP kinase phosphorylation of the CREB transcription factor.

Transcription of the AVP gene to produce AVP mRNA has daily rhythms, with mRNA levels peaking during the subjective day and reaching their lowest point in the subject night. This rhythm is regulated by the binding of circadian proteins to the E-box, along with transcriptional regulation of other elements, including the CRE in the promoter region.

== Function ==
AVP is primarily known for its role as a mammalian circadian output. The most common product of AVP is vasopressin, which is a neurohypophysial hormone that is important in homeostatic mechanisms and processes, like cortical EEG rhythms. Its other products are neurophysin II and copeptin. AVP is produced in a specific type of neuron called magnocellular neurons (MCNs), which are located in the hypothalamus. In mammals, the AVP gene is also transcribed in the suprachiasmatic nucleus where its expression is under the control of the circadian TTFL. It is well established that the finished vasopressin product is transported from the cell body to the terminals in the posterior pituitary gland where it is released into the bloodstream as a result of environmental stressors like dehydration.

=== Gene regulation ===
AVP gene regulation is controlled by the TTFL. In this system, per2 protein is transcribed and phosphorylated by the CK1E enzyme. Accumulation of this protein inhibits the transcription factors Clock and BMAL1, so that no additional per product is created. At the same time, per2 inhibits the transcription factors driving the AVP gene so that its expression and products are reduced. It can be noted that AVP expression is regulated by the TTFL in the SCN but not in the paraventricular nucleus of the hypothalamus (PVH) and supraoptic nucleus (SON).

=== Receptor pathways ===
Vasopressin is able to bind to one of three vasopressin receptors: AVPR1A, AVPR1B, and AVPR2. When vasopressin binds to AVPR1A, a G protein-coupled receptor (GPCR), phospholipase C (PLC) becomes activated. This pathway typically regulates vasoconstriction. When vasopressin binds to AVPR1B, a GPCR, the phosphatidylinositol-calcium second messenger system is stimulated. AVPR1A and AVPR1B are GPCRs that stimulate PLC to promote the production of DAG which activates PKC and IP3 and stimulates calcium ion release from the endoplasmic reticulum. This signaling pathway is important in regulating homeostasis and the amount of water, glucose, and salts within the blood via ACTH release and storage. When vasopressin binds to AVPR2, another GPCR, adenylyl cyclase is stimulated. This second messenger pathway involves the regulation of ADH, or vasopressin, in the kidneys, which has an important diuretic purpose of retaining water and manipulating the concentrations of soluble toxic wastes and urea in urine.

=== AVP gene in rats ===
Within rats, the AVP gene is important for the regulation of various processes associated with the excretory system and smooth muscle cells. The AVP gene and arginine vasopressin are commonly colocalized with oxytocin because synaptic transmission of oxytocin regulates the expression of AVP mRNA.

In one study conducted by Greenwood and colleagues, researchers found that AVP gene expression in rats is regulated by the cAMP responsive element-binding protein-3 like-1 (CREB3L1). CREB3L1 is activated when it is cleaved and when the AVP gene is translocated from the Golgi to the nucleus. Additionally, CREB3L1 mRNA levels correspond with increased amounts of transcription of the AVP gene in the hypothalamus following a deficiency of sodium and as a consequence of diurnal rhythm in the SCN. Both full-length and constitutively active forms of CREB3L1 (CREB3L1CA) induce the expression of rat AVP promoter-luciferase reporter constructs whereas a dominant-negative mutant reduces expression. From this study, the researchers concluded that CREB3L1 is a regulator of AVP gene transcription in the hypothalamus and specifically within the PVH and SON.

Arginine vasopressin stimulates the process of phosphorylation of aquaporin 2 (AQP2) of renal tissue which contributes to the overall increased permeability of water in the collecting duct cells of the tissue. The phosphorylation of AQP2 leads to activation of the protein kinase A signaling pathway which amplifies the permeability of water by stimulating the rat equivalent of the urea transporter 1 protein.

== Medical applications ==
The functions of vasopressin make it useful for a variety of important medical applications. Since it plays a role in the regulation of many physiological functions, like regulation of water and sodium excretion, blood volume, vasoconstriction, and response to stress, vasopressin can be helpful in the treatment of conditions related to these functions. These applications include treatment of nocturnal enuresis, diabetes insipidus, and hemophilia A. Additionally, it is used to treat some forms of shock including septic shock and vasodilatory shock. It is also used during surgery to decrease blood loss.
