= Herring bodies =

Structures in the pituitary gland

Neurosecretory body

Details
- Location: Posterior pituitary

Identifiers
- Latin: corpusculum neurosecretorium
- TH: H3.08.02.2.00039

Herring bodies or neurosecretory bodies are structures found in the posterior pituitary. They represent the terminal end of the axons from the hypothalamus, and hormones are temporarily stored in these locations. They are neurosecretory terminals.

Antidiuretic hormone (ADH) and oxytocin are both stored in Herring bodies, but are not stored simultaneously in the same Herring body.

In addition, each Herring body also contains ATP and a type of neurophysin. Neurophysins are binding proteins, of which there are two types: neurophysin I and neurophysin II, which bind to oxytocin and ADH, respectively. Neurophysin and its hormone become a complex considered a single protein and stored in the neurohypophysis. Upon stimulation by the hypothalamus, secretory granules release stored hormones into the bloodstream. Fibers from supraoptic nuclei are concerned with ADH secretion; paraventricular nuclei with oxytocin.

This anatomical structure was first described by Percy Theodore Herring in 1908.
