= Percy Herring =

Percy Theodore Herring (3 November 1872 – 24 October 1967) was a physician and physiologist, notable for first describing Herring bodies in the posterior pituitary gland.

== Life ==
He was born on 3 November 1872 in Yorkshire, England, the son of Edward and Mary Herring.

His family emigrated to New Zealand when he was young and he was schooled in Christchurch. He studied medicine at the University of Otago, New Zealand, returning to Scotland to complete his degree. He graduated from the University of Edinburgh with an MB in 1896. From 1898 to 1899 he was President of the Royal Medical Society. He received his MD in 1899 with a gold medal from the University of Edinburgh.

From 1908 until 1948 he held the Chandos Chair of Medicine and Physiology at the Bute Medical School, at the University of St Andrews, Scotland, during which time he described what are now known as Herring bodies, in 1908. He also carried out work on insulin, funded by the Medical Research Council. He was elected a fellow of the Royal Society of Edinburgh in 1916, his proposers being Edward Albert Sharpey-Schafer, Sir James Walker, Cargill Gilston Knott, and James Hartley Ashworth. In the same year he was elected a fellow of the Royal College of Physicians of Edinburgh. He served as vice-president of the Royal Society of Edinburgh from 1934 to 1937.

He was awarded the honorary LLD by the University of St Andrews.

He died at home, 16 Hepburn Gardens in St Andrews on 24 October 1967.

== Publications ==
- The Spinal Origin of the Cervical Sympathetic Nerve (1903)

== Family ==
He married Mary Marshall Callender on 7 April 1905. Together they had four daughters. One daughter, Margaret, married the archaeologist Terence Mitford.

His great-grandchild is Andrew Herring
