= Terence Mitford =

Scottish archaeologist and classicist (1905–1978)

Terence Mitford FBA FSA
- Born: Terence Bruce Mitford; 11 May 1905; Yokohama, Japan
- Died: 8 November 1978 (aged 73)
- Spouse: Margaret (m. 1936)
- Children: 5

Academic background
- Education: Dulwich College
- Alma mater: Jesus College, Oxford

Academic work
- Discipline: Archaeology
- Sub-discipline: Archaeology of Cyprus; epigraphy; Cypriot syllabary; Hellenistic period; Classical archaeology
- Institutions: University of St Andrews

Terence Bruce Mitford, FBA, FSA (sometimes known as Terence Bruce-Mitford) (11 May 1905 – 8 November 1978) was a Scottish archaeologist and classicist. He spent his whole career at the University of St Andrews, and had a special interest in the history and archaeology of Cyprus and southern Turkey, making many expeditions to these areas. His academic life was interrupted by the Second World War, during which he served with the Special Air Service and Special Boat Service.

== Biography ==
Mitford was born in Yokohama, Japan. His father was Charles Eustace Bruce Mitford, and Mitford's name was sometimes given as "Bruce-Mitford". A brother was Rupert Bruce-Mitford. Mitford was educated at Dulwich College before reading Literae Humaniores at Jesus College, Oxford – his rugby-playing interfered with his studies, and he did not obtain as high a class of degree as hoped. He spent his entire career at the University of St Andrews, teaching Latin text and prose composition, but his main interest was archaeology, in which he involved residents of St Andrews as well as students. He spent time in the 1930s on excavations in Cyprus – his main archaeological interest throughout his career was the exploration of the inscriptions on Cyprus. His obituary, in The Times, said that Mitford "contributed more than anyone has ever done to our knowledge of the mass of documentation which exists in the Cypriot dialect and the Cypriot syllabic script." He also worked on the history of Cyprus, looking at the island in Ptolemaic and early Roman times.

Shortly after the outbreak of the Second World War, he was commissioned into the Dorset Regiment as a second lieutenant on 15 October 1939. Transferred to the Special Operations Executive in June 1940, he was involved with John Pendlebury in establishing a resistance organisation in Crete, and during the Battle of Crete organised the defence of Rethymno airfield against the German parachutists. Escaping when the island fell, he set up the SOE station in Aleppo, recruited a band of convicted murderers, Kurds and Armenians, and organised SOE work for eastern Turkey, where they were to form a resistance force. But the German advance stalled in the Caucasus. Redeploying his Kalpaks? into the Special Air Service, he took part with them in the Allied invasion of Sicily with the Special Raiding Squadron, in July 1943. Later he served in the Special Boat Service in the Aegean, where in February 1944 he eliminated the German garrison of the holy island of Patmos, and distributed food to the starving population. When the SBS moved to the Adriatic, he returned to Crete as Liaison Officer with ELAS, and battles against the German occupying forces.^{[2]} For his war service to Greece, he was decorated by the Greek King, exceptionally, with the Knight's Cross of the Royal Order of George I, with Swords. After the war, he returned to St Andrews (where he was attached to the Officer Training Corps) and resumed his archaeological explorations in Cyprus. He was promoted to major on 1 April 1948, and nominally transferred to the Intelligence Corps. In his later career, he also looked at the archaeology and epigraphy of southern Turkey, making many expeditions there. He found many previously unknown inscriptions, assisting the work of the Austrian Academy of Sciences's Committee for the Archaeological Exploration of Asia Minor. His explorations were aided by his physical stamina, his resilience and his fluency in Greek and Turkish.

Mitford was appointed Reader in Classical Archaeology and retired as Honorary Emeritus Professor in 1973, the year that he was awarded a DLitt by the University of Oxford; he was elected a Fellow of the British Academy in the following year. He was elected as a Fellow of the Society of Antiquaries of London in 1940, and was also a corresponding member of the German Archaeological Institute and a Fellow of the Austrian Academy of Sciences. In retirement, he continued his hobby of studying birds, compiling data on Scandinavian migration and becoming an advisor to the government of Jordan on bird conservation.

== Personal life ==
In 1936, Mitford married Margaret, daughter of Professor Percy Herring. Together they had four sons and a daughter. He died on 8 November 1978, aged 73.

== Publications ==
- Contributions to the Epigraphy of Cyprus. Some Pre-Roman Inscriptions from Kouklia Mnemosyne (1938).
- Religious Documents from Roman Cyprus The Journal of Hellenic Studies (1946).
- Notes on Some Published Inscriptions from Roman Cyprus The Annual of the British School at Athens (1947).
- Kafizin and the Cypriot Syllabary The Classical Quarterly (1950).
- Excavations at Kouklia (Old Paphos), Cyprus, 1950, The Antiquaries Journal (1951).
- Some new inscriptions from early Christian Cyprus Byzantium (1958).
- Three Inscriptions of Marium Bulletin of the Institute of Classical Studies (1958).
- Helenos, Governor of Cyprus The Journal of Hellenic Studies (1959).
- A Cypriot Oath of Allegiance to Tiberius The Journal of Roman Studies (1960).
- The Hellenistic Inscriptions of Old Paphos The Annual of the British School at Athens (1961).
- Further Contributions to the Epigraphy of Cyprus American Journal of Archaeology (1961).
- The Inscriptions of Kourion. American Philosophical Society (1971).
- The Cypro-Minoan Inscriptions of Old Paphos Kadmos (1971).
- Roman Cyprus Politische Geschichte (Provinzen und Randvölker: Griechischer Balkanraum; Kleinasien [Forts.]) (1980), pp.1285–1518
- The Cults of Roman Cyprus Die religiösen Verhältnisse in den Provinzen [Forts.]) (1990), pp.2176-2278
- Bruce Mitford, Terence (1939). "Review of The Stoichedon Style in Greek Inscriptions, by Reginald Percy Austin". The Journal of Hellenic Studies. LIX (2). London: The Council of The Society for the Promotion of Hellenic Studies: 299. doi:10.2307/626614. JSTOR 626614. S2CID 163656857.

== Bibliography ==
- Maier, Franz Georg (1982). "Terence Bruce Mitford: 1905–1978" (PDF). Biographical Memoirs of Fellows of the British Academy. LXVII. British Academy: 433–442.
