= Neurophysins =

Carrier protein for oxytocin and vasopressin

Neurophysins are carrier proteins which transport the hormones oxytocin and vasopressin to the posterior pituitary from the paraventricular and supraoptic nucleus of the hypothalamus, respectively. Inside the neurosecretory granules, the analogous neurophysin I and II form stabilizing complexes via covalent interactions. Stabilizing neurophysin-hormone complexes that are formed within neurosecretory granules located in the posterior pituitary gland aid in intra-axonal transport. During intra-axonal transport, the neurophysins are believed to prevent the bound hormone from leaking into the cytoplasmic space and proteolytic digestion via enzymes. However, due to the low concentration of neurophysin in the blood, it is likely the protein-hormone complex dissociates, indicating the neurophysin does not aid in transporting the hormone through the circulatory system.

Neurophysins are also secreted out of the posterior pituitary hypothalamus, each carrying their respective associated passenger hormone. When the posterior pituitary hypothalamus secretes vasopressin and its neurophysin carrier, it also secretes a glycopeptide.

There are two types:

- Neurophysin I - Oxytocin
- Neurophysin II - Vasopressin (Also known as "antidiuretic hormone" or ADH)

== Biosynthesis of Neurophysins ==
These proteins are synthesized in the cell bodies of the supraoptic and paraventricular regions of the hypothalamus.

The disulfide-rich neurophysin protein is suggested to be congruent with the synthesis of insulin in which a precursor molecule of higher molecular weight is proteolytically cleaved and forms disulfide linkages.

Although not enough data has been obtained, it is hypothesized that there is a common precursor molecule between neurophysin and the two hormones it stabilizes.

== Structure ==
Neurophysins are acidic proteins with a molecular weight of approximately 10,000 Da that are rich in cysteine, glycine, and proline residues . The protein is double domain with a polypeptide chain of 93-95 residues with 14 cysteine residues forming 7 disulfide bridges . Domain I contains a COOH terminal with a disulfide loop; domain II lacks this COOH terminal disulfide loop . Based on the resemblance of the disulfide loop present on vasopressin and oxytocin, it is suggested that the hormones form covalent linkages to this disulfide loop present on the COOH terminal of domain I.

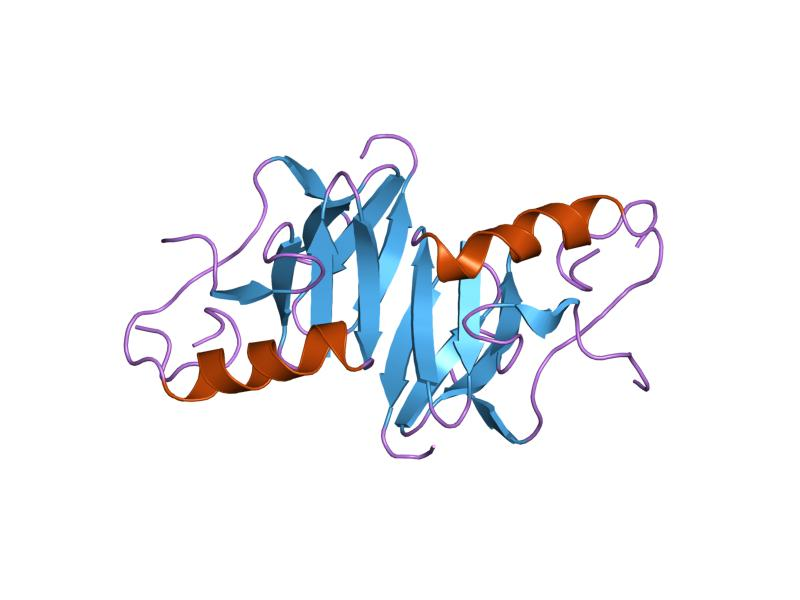
Neurophysin II protein domain unbound to vasopressin

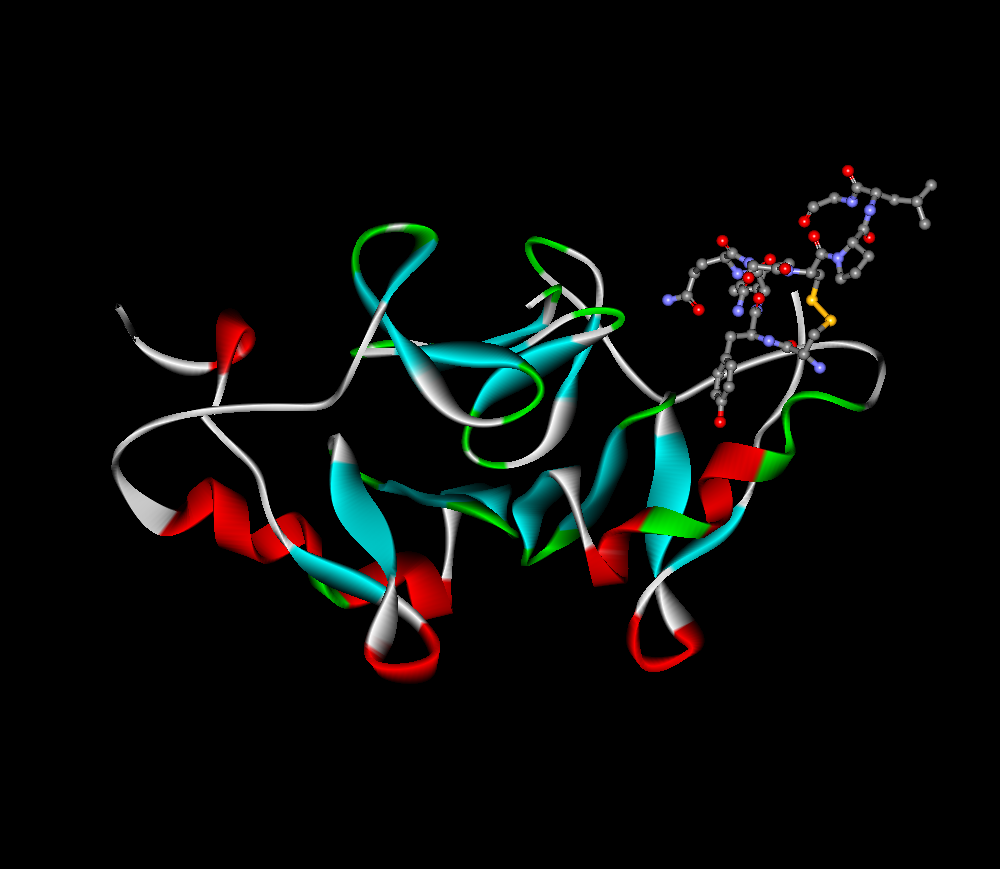
Neurophysin-Oxytocin complex

== See also ==
- Herring bodies
