= Neurophysin II =

Cleavage product of the arginine vasopressin gene

arginine vasopressin (neurophysin II, antidiuretic hormone, diabetes insipidus, neurohypophyseal)
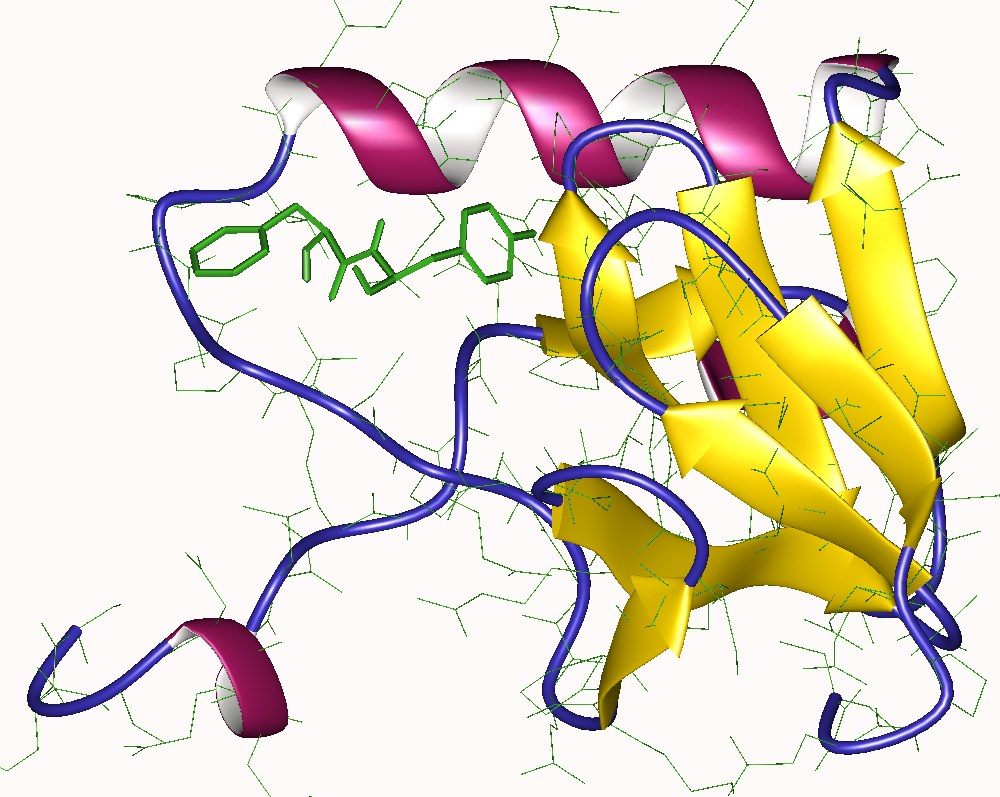
- neurophysin II, Bos taurus

Identifiers
- Symbol: AVP
- Alt. symbols: ARVP
- NCBI gene: 551
- HGNC: 894
- OMIM: 192340
- RefSeq: NM_000490
- UniProt: P01185

Other data
- Locus: Chr. 20 p13
Search for
- Structures: Swiss-model
- Domains: InterPro

Neurophysin II is a carrier protein that in humans is encoded by the AVP gene. Neurophysin II is synthesized in hypothalamic magnocellular neurons as a large pre-prohormone known as prepro-vasopressin-neurophysin II, which is then cleaved and processed in the endoplasmic reticulum to form the active hormone vasopressin, neurophysin II, and copeptin. Neurophysin II is packaged and transported in vesicles with vasopressin along axons, from magnocellular neurons of the hypothalamus to the posterior lobe of the pituitary. Neurophysin II protects vasopressin from early breakdown by enzymes while inside the transport vesicles, and is released into the bloodstream along with vasopressin to stimulate water reabsorption in response to an elevation of plasma osmolality, a 25% loss of blood volume, or stress.

== Structure ==
Neurophysin II is a dimer with each monomer consisting of two anti-parallel β-sheets. Each chain is identical with the exception of a single amino acid substitution (Chain 1 contains Lys-18, whereas chain 2 contains Ala-18). Each chain is 95 amino acids in length and binds a single oxytocin molecule. The amino acid sequence of Neurophysin II is:

NH_{2} - Ala - Met - Ser - Asp - Leu - Glu - Leu - Arg - Gln - Cys - Leu - Pro - Cys - Gly - Pro - Gly - Gly - Lys - Gly - Arg - Cys - Phe - Gly - Pro - Ser - Ile - Cys - Cys - Ala - Asp - Glu - Leu - Gly - Cys - Phe - Val - Gly - Thr - Ala - Glu - Ala - Leu - Arg - Cys - Gln - Glu - Glu - Asn - Tyr - Leu - Pro - Ser - Pro - Cys - Gln - Ser - Gly - Gln - Lys - Ala - Cys - Gly - Ser - Gly - Gly - Arg - Cys - Ala - Ala - Phe - Gly - Val - Cys - Cys - Asn - Asp - Glu - Ser - Cys - Val - Thr - Glu - Pro - Glu - Cys - Arg - Glu - Gly - Phe - His - Arg - Arg - Ala - OH

(Disulfide - bridge: - 10-54; - 13-27; - 21-44; - 28-34; - 61-73; - 67-85; - 74-79)

== Function ==
Neurophysin II is a carrier protein for vasopressin (ADH). It is produced in the cell bodies of the paraventricular and supraoptic nuclei and transported to its site of release in the axon terminals of the posterior pituitary. Oxytocin, a hormone similar in structure to vasopressin, is analogously bound and transported by neurophysin I. Both hormones are nine residues long, and only differ by the amino acids at positions three and eight. Oxytocin possesses Ile-3 whereas vasopressin possesses Phe-3. Both Ile and Phe are hydrophobic amino acids and undergo analogous binding to neurophysins.

== Clinical significance ==
Point mutations in the genes that encode arginine vasopressin and or its carrier protein neurophysin II underlie most cases of the familial, autosomal dominant disorder neurohypophyseal diabetes insipidus (also called hereditary hypothalamic diabetes insipidus). This condition results from insufficient ADH release into systemic circulation.

== See also ==
- Copeptin
- Neurophysins
- Neurophysin I
