= Copeptin =

Protein fragment in Homo sapiens

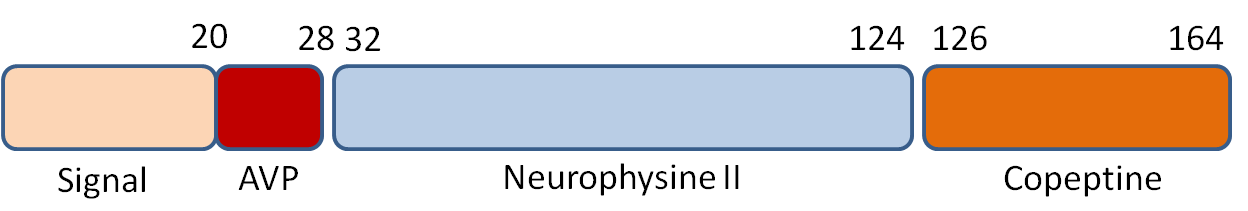
- Diagram of the pre-pro-vasopressin precursor showing position and size in amino acids of AVP, neurophysin II and copeptin

Identifiers
- Symbol: CT-proAVP
- Alt. symbols: copeptine
- OMIM: 192340
- UniProt: P01185

Other data
- Locus: Chr. 20 p13
Search for
- Structures: Swiss-model
- Domains: InterPro

Copeptin (also known as CT-proAVP) is a 39-amino acid-long peptide derived from the C-terminus of pre-pro-hormone of arginine vasopressin, neurophysin II and copeptin. Arginine vasopressin (AVP), also known as the antidiuretic hormone (ADH), is encoded by the AVP gene and is involved in multiple cardiovascular and renal pathways and abnormal level of AVP are associated with various diseases. Hence measurement of AVP would be useful, but is not commonly carried out in clinical practice because of its very short half-life making it difficult to quantify. In contrast, copeptin can be immunologically tested with ease and therefore can be used as a vasopressin surrogate marker.

== Synthesis and secretion ==
Copeptin is a 39-amino acid-long, glycosylated peptide. It is synthesized mainly in the paraventricular neurons of the hypothalamus and in the supraoptic nucleus. During axonal transport, pre-pro-AVP is proteolytically cleaved into vasopressin, neurophysin II and copeptin. These molecules are then stored in secretory granules in the posterior pituitary and released upon osmotic or non-osmotic (hemodynamical; stress-related) stimuli.

== Function ==
Once secreted into the bloodstream, there is no known biological role for copeptin. However, when pre-pro-vasopressin is processed during the axonal transport, copeptin may contribute to the 3D folding of vasopressin.

== Surrogate vasopressin marker ==
The size and half-life of copeptin permit an easier immunological testing, compared to vasopressin, and hence copeptin is proposed as a reliable AVP surrogate. The clinical interest in copeptin testing is closely linked to the pathophysiological pathways in which vasopressin is involved: polydipsia-polyuria syndrome, hyponatremia, syndrome of inappropriate antidiuretic hormone secretion (SIADH) as well as heart failure and acute coronary syndrome.

=== In blood ===
The concentration of copeptin in the blood circulation ranges from 1 to 12 pmol/L in healthy individuals. The levels of copeptin are slightly higher in men than in women and are not influenced by age. In response to serum osmolality fluctuations, the kinetics of copeptin are comparable to those of vasopressin. For example, patients with an electrolyte disorders such as diabetes insipidus with very low vasopressin concentrations also show very low copeptin concentrations in blood plasma. On the other hand, patients with syndrome of inappropriate antidiuretic hormone secretion show high concentrations of both vasopressin and copeptin.

=== Acute myocardial infarction ===
Several studies have shown that copeptin is released very early during the onset of an acute myocardial infarction (AMI), raising the question of its potential value in the diagnosis of AMI and particularly in ruling-out AMI. Indeed, copeptin is released much earlier than troponin, given that copeptin is actively released from the hypothalamus, while troponin occurs in the bloodstream as a breakdown product from dying cardiomyocytes, making the interpretation of their complementary kinetics a useful tool to rule-out AMI. It has been shown that the combination of a negative result of troponin together with a negative result of copeptin can rule out AMI at emergency department presentation with a negative predictive value ranging from 95% to 100%. These results have been confirmed in a randomised controlled trial.

=== Cardiogenic shock ===
High concentrations of vasopressin during cardiogenic shock have been widely described. It has been shown that the kinetics of copeptin are similar to vasopressin in that context.

=== Heart failure ===
The prognostic value of vasopressin for prediction of outcome in patients with heart failure has been known since the 1990s. Patients presenting with high levels of vasopressin have a worsened outcome. Recently, a similar interest has been demonstrated for copeptin in heart failure.

== See also ==
- Vasopressin
- Troponin
- Acute myocardial infarction
- Acute coronary syndrome
- Cardiogenic shock
- Heart failure
- Cerebral vascular accident
