= Neurophysin I =

Cleavage product of the coding protein of OXT gene

Identifiers
- Aliases: Oxytocin Associated NeurophysinOxytocin-Associated Neurophysin
- External IDs: GeneCards:
Orthologs
Databases	n/a
Species	Human	Mouse
Entrez	n/a	n/a
Ensembl	n/a	n/a
UniProt	n a	n/a
RefSeq (mRNA)	n/a	n/a
RefSeq (protein)	n/a	n/a
Location (UCSC)	n/a	n/a
PubMed search	n/a	n/a
- Wikidata
View/Edit Human

Neurophysin I is a carrier protein with a size of 10 KDa and contains 90 to 97 amino acids. It is a cleavage product (formed by splitting of a compound molecule into a simpler one) of preprooxyphysin. It is a neurohypophysial hormone that is transported in vesicles with oxytocin, the other cleavage product, along axons, from magnocellular neurons of the hypothalamus to the posterior lobe of the pituitary. Although it is stored in neurosecretory granules with oxytocin and released with oxytocin, its biological action is unclear.

== Structure ==
Neurophysin I is a small, acidic, cystine-rich carrier protein of about 10 kDa that adopts a compact, disulfide-stabilized two-domain architecture, with each domain related by internal duplication and contributing to a composite binding pocket for oxytocin.

Structurally, neurophysins comprise a single polypeptide chain of roughly 93–97 residues containing 14 cysteines arranged in a conserved pattern that forms seven intramolecular disulfide bridges, which rigidify the fold and create two homologous domains reminiscent of cystine knot–like plant lectin domains. Domain I contains a C‑terminal disulfide loop that is absent from domain II and is proposed to support high-affinity hormone association in the precursor, where the nonapeptide is covalently linked to the neurophysin C-terminus. In the 3.0 Å crystal structure of the neurophysin–oxytocin complex, the hormone-binding site lies at the end of a short 310 helix and is formed by residues from both domains of each monomer, burying oxytocin Tyr2 deep in a hydrophobic pocket and positioning the hormone disulfide (Cys1–Cys6) in proximity to the neurophysin disulfide network, consistent with earlier structure–function models derived from sequence and disulfide mapping studies.

== Function ==
Neurophysin I is the carrier protein for oxytocin. It is produced in the cell bodies of the paraventricular and supraoptic nuclei and transported to its site of release in the axon terminals of the posterior pituitary. Neurophysin I neurons are more prevalent in the paraventricular nuclei while Neurophysin II neurons are more prevalent in the supraoptic nuclei. Vasopressin, a hormone similar in structure to oxytocin, is analogously bound and transported by Neurophysin II. Both hormones are nine residues long, and share seven of these residues. Oxytocin possesses Ile-3 and Leu-8 whereas vasopressin possesses Phe-3 and Arg-8. Both Ile and Phe are hydrophobic amino acids and undergo analogous binding to neurophysins.

== See also ==
- Neurophysins
- Neurophysin II
