= Vasodilatory shock =

Medical emergency

- Other names: Refractory vasodilatory shock, refractory shock, irreversible shock, vasogenic shock, or vasoplegic shock.
- Specialty: Emergency medicine
- Complications: Multiple organ dysfunction
- Prevention: Early recognition and rapid treatment initiation for any types of shock.
- Prognosis: Higher than 50% mortality rate within a month

Vasodilatory shock, vasogenic shock, or vasoplegic shock is a medical emergency belonging to shock along with cardiogenic shock, septic shock, allergen-induced shock and hypovolemic shock. Vasodilatory shock occurs when the blood vessels relax too much, leading to extreme vasodilation. This reduces blood pressure, preventing blood flow and therefore oxygen delivery to the body's organs. If vasodilatory shock lasts more than a few minutes, the lack of oxygen starts to damage the organs. Vasodilatory shock must be treated quickly to avoid permanent organ damage or death from multiple organ dysfunction.

Treatment typically involves uses of vasopressors, inotropes, fluid boluses, and introduction of resuscitation. If vasodilatory shock does not respond to high doses of vasopressors (≥ 0.5 mg/kg/min norepinephrine-equivalent dose), it is called refractory vasodilatory shock or simply refractory shock. Adjunctive therapies include angiotensin II, hydrocortisone, thiamine, catecholamines, ascorbic acid and combinations of thereof.

== Signs and symptoms ==
- Confusion or lack of alertness
- Loss of consciousness
- A sudden and ongoing rapid heartbeat
- Sweating
- Pale skin
- A weak pulse
- Rapid breathing
- Decreased or no urine output
- Cool hands and feet

== Cause ==
A bacterial infection in the bloodstream, a severe allergic reaction (anaphylaxis), systemic inflammatory response syndrome, or damage to the nervous system (brain and nerves) may cause vasodilatory shock. Besides, nearly all kinds of distributive shock such as septic shock, neurogenic shock, anaphylactic shock, drug and toxin-induced shock, endocrine shock can turn out into refractory vasodilatory shock when the original shock becomes more severe.

The most common cause of vasodilatory shock is sepsis. Except sepsis, other causes comprise severe acute pancreatitis, post cardiopulmonary bypass vasoplegia and other triggers for a systemic inflammatory response syndrome. Low serum calcium values might take a role in vasodilatory shock.

== Pathophysiology ==
In the cases of cardiogenic shock resulting from heart failure or acute hemorrhagic shock caused by a large volume of blood loss, the body constricts peripheral vessels to reverse the low arterial pressure that causes inadequate tissue perfusion. With vasodilatory shock, it is difficult for the peripheral vascular smooth muscle to constrict. In refractory vasodilatory shock, peripheral vascular smooth muscle responds poorly to therapy with vasopressor drugs.

Vasopressin deficiency may play an important role in vasodilatory shock. In refractory vasodilatory shock, the patient has both vasopressin secretion deficit and an advanced resistance to vasopressin-induced blood-pressure changes. Some have hypothesized that patients with vasopressin deficiency, including a decrease in baroreceptor stimulation, appear to have impaired autonomic reflexes. Tone may be inhibited by atrial stretch receptors and vasopressin release may be inhibited by nitric oxide or high circulating levels of norepinephrine.

Vasodilatory shock is often involved with the dysfunction of physiologic compensatory mechanisms such as the sympathetic nervous system, vasopressin arginine system and renin-angiotensin aldosterone system.

== Diagnosis ==
The definition of refractory shock or vasodilatory shock varies. In 2018, the American College of Chest Physician stated that it is presents if there is an inadequate response to high-dose vasopressor therapy defined as ≥ 0.5 mg/kg/min norepinephrine-equivalent dose.

Drug	Dose	Norepiniphrine equivalent
Epinephrine	0.1 μg/Kg/min	0.1 μg/Kg/min
Dopamine	15 μg/Kg/min	0.1 μg/Kg/min
Norepinephrine	0.1 μg/Kg/min	0.1 μg/Kg/min
Phenylephrine	1 μg/Kg/min	0.1 μg/Kg/min
Vasopressin	0.04 U/Kg/min	0.1 μg/Kg/min

== Management ==
Reversing the underlying causes of vasodilatory shock, stabilizing hemodynamic, preventing renal, myocardial, and other organs from injuries due to hypoperfusion and hypoxia, and taking necessary measures to safeguard against complications including venous thromboembolism are served as the top priorities during the treatment.

The initial treatment aiming at restoring effective blood pressure in patients that have refractory shock typically starts with introducing norepinephrine and dopamine. Vasopressin comes as the second-line agent.

However, high-dose therapy is linked to excessive coronary, splanchnic vasoconstriction, and hypercoagulation. Excessive vasoconstriction can cause cardiac output reduction or even fatal heart complication particularly in those with weak myocardial function.

In those whose vasodilatory shock is caused by hypocalcemic cardiomyopathy in the context of dilated cardiomyopathy with documented both reduced heart ejection fraction and contractile performance, the uses of calcium and active vitamin D or recombinant human parathyroid hormone treatment are viable since there were many successful cases reported while given the physiological role of calcium on muscle contraction.

A successful treatment requires leveraging the respective unique contributions of a multi-disciplinary team not only critical care doctors and often, infectious disease specialists but also respiratory therapy, nursing, pharmacy and others in collaboration.

== Epidemiology ==
Observational studies suggest that, about 6% to 7% of critically ill people may end up developing refractory shock.

== Prognosis ==
Early recognition and rapid treatment initiation are crucial to saving life. If vasodilatory shock being left untreated, even brief hypotensive periods can result in myocardial and renal injury. It can also increase mortality in the critically ill. Refractory shock has an all-cause mortality rate greater than 50% within a month.
