= Scott Waldman =

American scientist

- Education: Stanford Medical School; University at Albany, SUNY
- Scientific career
- Fields: Biomedical science
- Workplaces: Jefferson Medical College

Scott A. Waldman is an MD and biomedical scientist at Sidney Kimmel Medical College of Thomas Jefferson University, where he is the Samuel M.V. Hamilton Professor of Medicine, and also tenured professor and chair of the Department of Pharmacology & Experimental Therapeutics. He is author of a pharmacology textbook, and former chief editor of Clinical Pharmacology & Therapeutics. He is known for his work in atrial natriuretic factor intracellular signaling through guanylate cyclase (GC), and the relation of Guanylyl cyclase C (GC-C) to the pathogenesis of colorectal cancer. Also for his hypotheses concerning the roles of intestinal paracrine hormones (uroguanylin, guanylin) in satiety, obesity and cancer risk. Waldman also holds a concurrent position as adjunct professor at the University of Delaware, School of Health Sciences.

== Education ==
Waldman was born in Brooklyn, New York on October 22, 1953. He completed a BS degree in biology from the State University of New York at Albany in 1975, followed by a Ph.D. degree in Human Anatomy from Thomas Jefferson University, Philadelphia (1980), where he worked at the Daniel Baugh Institute of Anatomy. He completed postdoctoral fellowships in pharmacology first at University of Virginia (1981) and then at Stanford University (1983) with Nobel laureate Ferid Murad who acknowledged him as a major contributor in his Nobel lecture. He then attended medical school, and graduated as an MD from Stanford University, Palo Alto (1987). He then had his internship (1987–1988) and clinical residency (1988–1990) in the department of medicine, Stanford University Hospital, Palo Alto.

== Academic career ==
After his clinical training he became an assistant professor in the Division of Clinical Pharmacology in the department of medicine of Thomas Jefferson University in 1990. Since then he has remained at Jefferson Medical College, where he has stepped up the academic ladder to Samuel M.V. Hamilton Professor of Medicine (since 1998), and tenured professor and chair of the Department of Pharmacology and Experimental Therapeutics (since 2005).

At Jefferson, he has acted as director of the Jefferson Center for Individualized Medicine (2011–2015), Since 2010 he has also been associate dean of clinical and translational sciences at Jefferson Medical College (2010–2016), and vice president of clinical and translational research at Thomas Jefferson University (2010–2016). Since 2012 Waldman has held a concurrent position as an adjunct professor at the School of Health Sciences of the University of Delaware. He is also director of the Gastrointestinal Malignancies Program at the Sidney Kimmel Cancer Center of Thomas Jefferson University. From 2017 to 2020, Waldman was a visiting professor at the Xuzhou Cancer Hospital, Xuzhou, China.

From 1983 to 1990 Waldman was a staff pharmacologist at the Veterans Administration Medical Center, Palo Alto. From 1991 to 1997 he was the medical director of the Clinical Research Unit at Thomas Jefferson University Hospital, where he now is an attending physician.

Institutional profiles with details of Waldman's career are visible on the internet.

== Academic service ==
Waldman has lent academic service by his participation in committees of institutions such as NIH and FDA, in areas like clinical pharmacology training, translational research, and extramural activities.

=== Awards ===
- 2010 – Henry Elliott Distinguished Service Award, American Society for Clinical Pharmacology and Therapeutics
- 2011 – PhRMA Foundation Award in Excellence in Clinical Pharmacology
- 2012 – Rawls Palmer Progress in Medicine Award, American Society for Clinical Pharmacology and Therapeutics
- 2015 – Reynold Spector Award in Clinical Pharmacology, American Society for Pharmacology and Experimental Therapeutics
- 2017 – Elected Fellow, National Academy of Inventors
- 2020 – Elected Fellow of the American Society for Pharmacology and Experimental Therapeutics

== Works ==
=== Research ===
His early career was devoted to characterize the receptor-mediated responses to atrial natriuretic peptide (ANP) in vascular smooth muscle and other cell types, especially its stimulation of guanylyl cyclase to cause the intracellular accumulation of cGMP in the context of vasodilatory phenomena. His subsequent studies on the ANP-like stimulation of guanylyl cyclase by enterotoxins eventually led to new research venues into the study of guanylyl cyclase C and its role in the pathogenesis of colorectal cancer.

Recently, Waldman has extensively explored concepts surrounding the role of membrane-bound GUCY2C receptors lining the gastrointestinal tract in relation to the homeostatic regulation of the crypt-surface axis by paracrine hormones uroguanylin and guanylin. His recent research includes the experimental targeting of such receptors in various ways for the treatment of inflammatory bowel disease and colorectal neoplasia, including (under his leadership) a phase-I clinical trial to test a recombinant vaccine against colorectal cancer aimed to immunize against GUCY2C receptors.

== Publications ==
He was the former chief editor of Clinical Pharmacology & Therapeutics

=== Peer-reviewed journal articles ===
Waldman has published over 300 research articles in peer-reviewed journals. His most cited articles are:

- SA Waldman, RM Rapoport, F Murad (1984) Atrial natriuretic factor selectively activates particulate guanylate cyclase and elevates cyclic GMP in rat tissues./ Journal of Biological Chemistry 259 (23), 14332–14334 According to Google Scholar, this article has been cited 755 times.
- R J Winquist, E P Faison, S A Waldman, K Schwartz, F Murad, and R M Rapoport (1984) Atrial natriuretic factor elicits an endothelium-independent relaxation and activates particulate guanylate cyclase in vascular smooth muscle. PNAS December 1, 1984 81 (23) 7661–7664; According to Google Scholar, this article has been cited 598 times.
- Jozef Bartunek, Atta Behfar, Dariouch Dolatabadi, Marc Vanderheyden, Miodrag Ostojic, Jo Dens, Badih El Nakadi, Marko Banovic, Branko Beleslin, Mathias Vrolix, Victor Legrand, Christian Vrints, Jean Louis Vanoverschelde, Ruben Crespo-Diaz, Christian Homsy, Michal Tendera, Scott Waldman, William Wijns, Andre Terzic. ( June 2013) Cardiopoietic Stem Cell Therapy in Heart Failure; The C-CURE (Cardiopoietic stem Cell therapy in heart failURE) Multicenter Randomized Trial With Lineage-Specified Biologics. Journal of the American College of Cardiology Volume 61, Issue 23, DOI: 10.1016/j.jacc.2013.02.071 According to Google Scholar, this article has been cited 400 times.

=== Reviews ===
Waldman has authored over 50 research review articles. His most cited reviews are:

- Lucas, K. A., Pitari, G. M., Kazerounian, S., Ruiz-Stewart, I., Park, J., Schulz, S., Chepenik KP & Waldman, S. A. (2000). Guanylyl cyclases and signaling by cyclic GMP. Pharmacological reviews, 52(3), 375–414.Guanylyl cyclases and cyclic GMP, According to Google Scholar, this review has been cited 1439 times.
- SA Waldman, Cyclic GMP synthesis and function, Pharmacological Reviews 39, 163-196 (1987) According to Google Scholar, this review has been cited 1047 times.

=== Books ===
Together with Andre Terzic, in 2009 Waldman was co-editor of the multi-author textbook Pharmacology and Therapeutics: Principles to Practice, ISBN 978-1-4160-3291-5, (Saunders-Elsevier)
