= List of human hormones =

Hormones are signaling molecules produced by specialized cells in various human tissues and organs. They regulate diverse physiological processes by binding to specific receptors. Human hormones are commonly grouped into four major structural classes:

SN	Class	Examples
1	amino acid derivatives	epinephrine and thyroxine
2	eicosanoids	prostaglandins and leukotriene
3	peptide/protein	insulin, growth hormone, and oxytocin
4	steroids	cortisol, estrogen, and testosterone

Spelling conventions vary between regions. For example, current North American and international usage favors estrogen and gonadotropin, whereas British usage retains the Greek digraph in oestrogen and prefers the earlier spelling gonadotrophin.

The following is a list of hormones found in Homo sapiens organized by structural classes.

== Amine ==
SN	Name	Abbr.	Type	Tissue	Cells	Receptor	Target tissue	Effect
1	Adrenaline (or epinephrine)	EPI	Amino acid derivative	adrenal gland	Adrenal medulla / Tyrosine	adrenergic receptor	nearly all tissues	increase systolic blood pressure, glycogenolysis, lipolysis, increase cardiac output, influence goosebumps, etc.
2	Melatonin	MT	Amino acid derivative	pineal gland	Pinealocyte / Tryptophan	melatonin receptor	CNS and peripheral tissue	sleep–wake cycle
3	Noradrenaline (or norepinephrine)	NE	Amino acid derivative	adrenal gland	Adrenal medulla / Tyrosine	noradrenergic receptor	nearly all tissues	increases both systolic and diastolic blood pressure, glycogenolysis, lipolysis increases metabolism, etc.
4	Triiodothyronine	T_{3}	Amino acid derivative	peripheral tissue of thyroid gland	Thyroid follicular cell / Tyrosine	thyroid hormone receptor	nearly every cell in the body	increased metabolism
5	Thyroxine	T_{4}	Amino acid derivative	thyroid gland	Thyroid follicular cell / Tyrosine	thyroid hormone receptor	nearly every cell in the body	control carbohydrate, protein and fat metabolism and control physical, mental growth of body
6	Dopamine	DA	Amino acid derivative	substantia nigra (mainly)	Phenylalanine / Tyrosine	D1 and D2	system-wide	regulation of cellular cAMP levels, prolactin antagonist

== Eicosanoid ==
Eicosanoid for more information about this class of paracrine signalling chemicals and hormones.

SN	Name	Abbr.	Type	Tissue	Cells	Receptor	Target Tissue	Effect
7	Prostaglandins	PG	Eicosanoid	All nucleated cells		prostaglandin receptor		vasodilation
8	Leukotrienes	LT	Eicosanoid	Blood	white blood cells	G protein-coupled receptors		increase vascular permeability
9	Prostacyclin	PGI_{2}	Eicosanoid			prostacyclin receptor		vasodilation, platelet activation inhibitor
10	Thromboxane	TXA_{2}	Eicosanoid	Blood	platelets	thromboxane receptor		vasoconstriction, platelet aggregation

== Polypeptide (Peptide/protein) ==
SN	Name	Abbr.	Type	Tissue	Cells	Receptor	Target Tissue	Effect
11	Amylin (or Islet Amyloid Polypeptide)	IAPP	Peptide	pancreas	pancreatic β-cells	amylin receptor		Slows down gastric emptying, inhibits digestive secretion to reduce food intake
12	Anti-Müllerian hormone (or Müllerian-inhibiting factor/hormone)	AMH (or MIF or MIH)	Peptide	testes	Sertoli cell	AMHR2		Inhibit release of prolactin and TRH from anterior pituitary
13	Adiponectin	Acrp30	Peptide	adipose tissue		adiponectin receptors		regulating glucose levels
14	Adrenocorticotropic hormone (or corticotropin)	ACTH	Peptide	anterior pituitary	corticotrope	ACTH receptor → cAMP		synthesis of corticosteroids (glucocorticoids and androgens) in adrenocortical cells
15	Angiotensinogen and Angiotensin	AGT	Peptide	liver		angiotensin receptor → IP_{3}		vasoconstriction release of aldosterone from adrenal cortex dipsogen.
16	Antidiuretic hormone (or vasopressin, arginine vasopressin)	ADH	Peptide	posterior pituitary	Parvocellular neurosecretory neurons in hypothalamus Magnocellular neurosecretory cells in posterior pituitary	AVPRs, VACM-1	Renal tubules of nephrons of kidneys (mainly)	reabsorption of water in kidneys moderate vasoconstriction increase permeability of distal tubule of nephrons (in kidneys) to water release ACTH in anterior pituitary
17	Atrial natriuretic peptide (or atriopeptin)	ANP	Peptide	heart		ANP receptor → cGMP		increase sodium and GFR excretion, antagonize venal constriction, inhibit renin secretion
18	Brain natriuretic peptide	BNP	Peptide	heart	Cardiac myocytes	NPR		(To a minor degree than ANP) reduce blood pressure by: reducing systemic vascular resistance, reducing blood water, sodium and fats
19	Calcitonin	CT	Peptide	thyroid gland	parafollicular cell	CT receptor → cAMP		Construct bone, reduce blood Ca^{2+}
20	Cholecystokinin	CCK	Peptide	duodenum		CCK receptor		Release of digestive enzymes from pancreas Release of bile from gallbladder Hunger suppressant
21	Corticotropin-releasing hormone	CRH	Peptide	hypothalamus		CRF1 → cAMP		Release ACTH from anterior pituitary
22	Cortistatin	CORT	Peptide	cerebral cortex	inhibitory neurons	Somatostatin receptor		depression of neuronal activity; induction of slow-wave sleep; reduction of locomotor activity; activation of cation selective currents not responsive to somatostatin
23	Enkephalin		Peptide	Kidney	Chromaffin cells	Opioid receptor		Regulate pain
24	Endothelin		Peptide	Vascular endothelium	Endothelial cells	ET receptor		Smooth muscle contraction of medium-sized vessels
25	Erythropoietin	EPO	Peptide	kidney	Extraglomerular mesangial cells	EpoR		Stimulate erythrocyte production
26	Follicle-stimulating hormone	FSH	Peptide	anterior pituitary	gonadotrope	FSH receptor → cAMP		In female: stimulates maturation of Graafian follicles in ovary. In male: spermatogenesis, enhances production of androgen-binding protein by the Sertoli cells of the testes
27	Galanin	GAL	Peptide	central nervous system and gastrointestinal tract		GALR1, GALR2, and GALR3		modulation and inhibition of action potentials in neurons
28	Gastric inhibitory polypeptide	GIP	Peptide	mucosa of the duodenum and the jejunum	K cell	GIPR		Induces insulin secretion
29	Gastrin	GAS	Peptide	stomach, duodenum	G cell	CCK_{2}		Secretion of gastric acid by parietal cells
30	Ghrelin		Peptide	stomach	P/D1 cell	ghrelin receptor		Stimulate appetite, secretion of growth hormone from anterior pituitary gland
31	Glucagon	GCG	Peptide	pancreas	alpha cells of Islets of Langerhans	Glucagon receptor → cAMP		glycogenolysis and gluconeogenesis in liver, activates lipase enzyme in adipose tissue cells, increases blood glucose level, inhibits storage of triglyceride in liver
32	Glucagon-like peptide-1	GLP1	Peptide	ileum	L cells	GLP1R, GLP2R	pancreatic beta cells of Islets of Langerhans	Stimulates the adenylyl cyclase pathway, resulting in increased synthesis and release of insulin
33	Gonadotropin-Releasing Hormone	GnRH	Peptide	hypothalamus		GnRH receptor → IP_{3}	pituitary gland	Release of FSH and LH from anterior pituitary.
34	Growth Hormone-Releasing Hormone	GHRH	Peptide	hypothalamus		GHRH receptor → IP_{3}	pituitary gland	Release GH from anterior pituitary
35	Hepcidin	HAMP	Peptide	liver		ferroportin		Inhibits iron export from cells
36	Human Chorionic Gonadotropin	HCG	Peptide	placenta	syncytiotrophoblast cells	LH receptor → cAMP		Promote maintenance of corpus luteum during beginning of pregnancy, Inhibit immune response, towards the human embryo, serves as the basis of early pregnancy test
37	Human placental lactogen	HPL	Peptide	placenta				Increase production of insulin and IGF-1 Increase insulin resistance and carbohydrate intolerance
38	Growth hormone	GH or hGH	Peptide	anterior pituitary	somatotropes	GH receptor		Stimulates growth and cell reproduction Release Insulin-like growth factor 1 from liver
39a	Activin		Peptide	gonads, pituitary, placenta	granulosa cells of ovary Sertoli cells of testes gonadotrophs in anterior pituitary trophoblasts in placenta	Activin receptor (type I and II serine/threonine kinase receptors)	anterior pituitary	Stimulates production and secretion of FSH
39b	Inhibin		Peptide	testes, ovary, fetus	Sertoli cells of testes granulosa cells of ovary trophoblasts in foetus		anterior pituitary	Inhibit production of FSH
40	Insulin also called hypoglycemic hormone and anti ketogenic hormone ||		Peptide	pancreas	beta cells of Islets of Langerhans	insulin receptor, IGF-1, IGF-2		Intake of glucose, promotes glycogenesis, prevents glycogenolysis and neoglucogenesis, intake of lipids, synthesis of triglycerides in adipocytes, helps in oxidation of sugar through Krebs cycle, inhibits production of ketone bodies, inactivates phosphorylase enzyme, Other anabolic effects
41	Insulin-like growth factor (or somatomedin)	IGF	Peptide	liver	Hepatocytes	insulin receptor, IGF-1		Insulin-like effects, regulates cell growth and development|-
42	Leptin	LEP	Peptide	adipose tissue		LEP-R		Decrease of appetite and increase of metabolism.
43	Lipotropin	LPH	Peptide	anterior pituitary	Corticotropes			Lipolysis and steroidogenesis, stimulates melanocytes to produce melanin
44	Luteinizing hormone	LH	Peptide	anterior pituitary	gonadotropes	LHR → cAMP		In female: ovulation In male: stimulates Leydig cell production of testosterone
45	Melanocyte stimulating hormone	MSH or α-MSH	Peptide	anterior pituitary/pars intermedia	Melanotroph	melanocortin receptor → cAMP		melanogenesis by melanocytes in skin and hair
46	Motilin	MLN	Peptide	Small intestine		Motilin receptor		stimulates gastric activity
47	Orexin		Peptide	hypothalamus		OX_{1}, OX_{2}		Wakefulness and increased energy expenditure, increased appetite
48	Osteocalcin	OCN	Peptide	Skeleton	Osteoblasts	Gprc6a	Muscle Brain Pancreas Testes	Favors muscle function, memory formation, testosterone synthesis and energy expenditure
49	Oxytocin	OXT	Peptide	posterior pituitary	Magnocellular neurosecretory cells	OXT receptor → IP_{3}		Stimulates contraction of cervix and vagina. Involved in orgasm, social bonding, and circadian homeostasis (body temperature, activity level, wakefulness).
50	Pancreatic polypeptide		Peptide	Pancreas	PP cells	pancreatic polypeptide receptor 1		Self-regulation of pancreatic secretions (endocrine and exocrine). It also affects hepatic glycogen levels and gastrointestinal secretions.
51	Parathyroid hormone	PTH	Peptide	parathyroid gland	parathyroid chief cell	PTH receptor → cAMP		increase blood Ca^{2+}: indirectly stimulate osteoclasts; Ca^{2+} reabsorption in kidney; activate vitamin D; (Slightly) decrease blood phosphate: (decreased reuptake in kidney but increased uptake from bones; activate vitamin D )
52	Pituitary adenylate cyclase-activating peptide	PACAP	Peptide	multiple		ADCYAP1R1, VIPR1, VIPR2		Stimulates enterochromaffin-like cells
53	Prolactin (or luteotropic hormone)	PRL	Peptide	anterior pituitary, uterus	lactotrophs of anterior pituitary Decidual cells of uterus	PRL receptor		Milk production in mammary glands
54	Prolactin-releasing hormone	PRLH	Peptide	hypothalamus				Release prolactin from anterior pituitary
55	Relaxin	RLN	Peptide	Corpus luteum, Uterus, placenta, and Mammary gland	Decidual cells	RLN receptor		Relaxation of muscle and ligament tissues in female humans as preparation for menstruation. Anticipatory release for ductus deferens in males. Cardiac vasodilator.
56	Renin		Peptide	Kidney	Juxtaglomerular cells			Activates the renin–angiotensin system by producing angiotensin I of angiotensinogen
57	Secretin	SCT	Peptide	duodenum	S cell	SCT receptor		Secretion of bicarbonate from liver, pancreas and duodenal Brunner's glands Enhances effects of cholecystokinin Stops production of gastric juice
58	Somatostatin (or growth hormone–inhibiting hormone or growth hormone release–inhibiting hormone or somatotropin release–inhibiting factor or somatotropin release–inhibiting hormone)	GHIH or GHRIH or SRIF or SRIH	Peptide	hypothalamus, islets of Langerhans, gastrointestinal system	delta cells in islets Neuroendocrince cells of the Periventricular nucleus in hypothalamus	Somatostatin receptor		Inhibit release of GH and TRH from anterior pituitary Suppress release of gastrin, cholecystokinin (CCK), secretin, motilin, vasoactive intestinal peptide (VIP), gastric inhibitory polypeptide (GIP), enteroglucagon in gastrointestinal system Lowers rate of gastric emptying Reduces smooth muscle contractions and blood flow within the intestine Inhibit release of insulin from beta cells Inhibit release of glucagon from alpha cells Suppress the exocrine secretory action of pancreas.
59	Thrombopoietin	TPO	Peptide	liver, kidney, striated muscle	Myocytes	TPO receptor	megakaryocytes	produce platelets
60	Thyroid-stimulating hormone (or thyrotropin)	TSH	Peptide	anterior pituitary	thyrotropes	Thyrotropin receptor → cAMP	thyroid gland	secrete thyroxine (T_{4}) and triiodothyronine (T_{3})
61	Thyrotropin-releasing hormone	TRH	Peptide	hypothalamus	Parvocellular neurosecretory neurons	TRHR → IP_{3}	anterior pituitary	Release thyroid-stimulating hormone (primarily); Stimulate prolactin release
62	Vasoactive intestinal peptide	VIP	Peptide	gut, pancreas, and suprachiasmatic nuclei of the hypothalamus		Vasoactive intestinal peptide receptor		stimulates contractility in the heart, causes vasodilation, increases glycogenolysis, lowers arterial blood pressure and relaxes the smooth muscle of trachea, stomach and gall bladder
63	Guanylin	GN	Peptide	gut		guanylate cyclase 2C (heat stable enterotoxin receptor)		regulates electrolyte and water transport in intestinal epithelia.
64	Uroguanylin	UGN	Peptide	renal tissues		guanylate cyclase 2C (heat stable enterotoxin receptor)		regulates electrolyte and water transport in renal epithelia.

== Steroid ==
SN	Name	Chemical Class	Abbr.	Tissue	Cells	Receptor	Target Tissue	Effect
65	Testosterone	androgen		testes, ovary	Leydig cells	AR		libido, Anabolic: growth of muscle mass and strength, increased bone density, growth and strength, Virilizing: maturation of sex organs, formation of scrotum, deepening of voice, growth of beard and axillary hair.
66	Dehydroepiandrosterone	androgen	DHEA	testes, ovary, kidney	Zona fasciculata and Zona reticularis cells of kidney theca cells of ovary Leydig cells of testes	AR		Virilization, anabolic
67	Androstenedione	androgen		adrenal glands, gonads		AR		Substrate for estrogen
68	Dihydrotestosterone	androgen	DHT	multiple		AR		5-DHT or DHT is a male reproductive hormone that targets the prostate gland, bulbourethral gland, seminal vesicles, penis and scrotum and promotes growth/mitosis/cell maturation and differentiation. Testosterone is converted to 5-DHT by 5alpha-reductase, usually within the target tissues of 5-DHT because of the need for high concentrations of 5-dht to produce the physiological effects.
69	Aldosterone	mineralocorticoid		adrenal cortex (zona glomerulosa)		MR		Increase blood volume by reabsorption of sodium in kidneys (primarily) Potassium and H^{+} secretion in kidney.
70	Estradiol	estrogen	E_{2}	females: ovary, males testes	females: granulosa cells, males: Sertoli cell	ER		Females: Structural: promote formation of female secondary sex characteristics; stimulate endometrial growth; increase uterine growth; maintenance of blood vessels and skin; reduce bone resorption; increase hepatic production of binding proteins; Coagulation: increase circulating level of factors 2, 7, 9, 10, antithrombin III, plasminogen; increase platelet adhesiveness; Fluid balance: salt (sodium) and water retention; increase growth hormone; increase cortisol, SHBG; Gastrointestinal tract: reduce bowel motility; increase cholesterol in bile; Lung function: promote lung function by supporting alveoli.; Males: Prevent apoptosis of germ cells
71	Estrone	estrogen		ovary	granulosa cells, Adipocytes	ER		
72	Estriol	estrogen	E_{3}	placenta	syncytiotrophoblast	ER		
73	Cortisol	glucocorticoid		adrenal cortex (zona fasciculata and zona reticularis cells)		GR		Stimulation of gluconeogenesis Inhibition of glucose uptake in muscle and adipose tissue Mobilization of amino acids from extrahepatic tissues Stimulation of fat breakdown in adipose tissue anti-inflammatory and immunosuppressive
74	Progesterone	progestogen		ovary, adrenal glands, placenta (when pregnant)	Granulosa cells theca cells of ovary	PR		Support pregnancy: Convert endometrium to secretory stage; Make cervical mucus permeable to sperm; Inhibit immune response, e.g. towards the human embryo.; Decrease uterine smooth muscle contractility; Inhibit lactation; Inhibit onset of labor; Support fetal production of adrenal mineralo- and glucosteroids; Other: Raise epidermal growth factor-1 levels; Increase core temperature during ovulation; Reduce spasm and relax smooth muscle (widen bronchi and regulate mucus); Antiinflammatory. Regulate immune response; Reduce gall-bladder activity; Normalize blood clotting and vascular tone, zinc and copper levels, cell oxygen levels, and use of fat stores for energy; Assist in thyroid function and bone growth by osteoblasts; Resilience in bone, teeth, gums, joint, tendon, ligament and skin healing by regulating collagen; Nerve function and healing by regulating myelin; Prevent endometrial cancer by regulating effects of estrogen
75	Calcitriol	secosteroid (1,25-dihydroxyvitamin D_{3})		skin/proximal tubule of kidneys		VDR		Active form of vitamin D_{3} Increase absorption of calcium and phosphate from gastrointestinal tract and kidneys inhibit release of PTH
76	Calcidiol	secosteroid (25-hydroxyvitamin D_{3})		skin/proximal tubule of kidneys		VDR		Inactive form of vitamin D_{3}
