= Psychogenic disease =

Class of mental disorder

Classified as a "conversion disorder" by the DSM-IV, a psychogenic disease is a condition in which mental stressors cause physical symptoms which may or may not match another known physical disorder. The manifestation of physical symptoms without biologically identifiable cause results from disruptions in normal brain function due to psychological stress. During a psychogenic episode, neuroimaging has shown that neural circuits affecting functions such as emotion, executive functioning, perception, movement, and volition are inhibited. These disruptions become strong enough to prevent the brain from voluntarily allowing certain actions (e.g. moving a limb). When the brain is unable to signal to the body to perform an action voluntarily, physical symptoms of a disorder arise. Examples of diseases that are deemed to be psychogenic in origin include psychogenic seizures, psychogenic polydipsia, psychogenic tremor, and psychogenic pain.

The term psychogenic disease is often used similarly to psychosomatic disease. However, the term psychogenic usually implies that psychological factors played a key causal role in the development of the illness. The term psychosomatic is often used more broadly to describe illnesses with a known medical cause where psychological factors may nonetheless play a role (e.g., asthma as exacerbated by anxiety).

== Diagnosis ==
With the advent of medical screening technologies such as electroencephalography (EEG) monitoring, psychogenic diseases are being diagnosed more frequently, as medical professionals have increasingly precise tools to evaluate patients. When a patient does not display typical markers of a disorder that would normally show up from medical exams, physicians may diagnose a patient's symptoms as being psychogenic. Research into understanding psychogenic disorders has led to the development of electronic diagnostic tests for ruling out the usual biological markers of a disorder, as well as new clinical observation procedures. A test a physician may employ for identifying a psychogenic disorder would be to see if the symptom changes with suggestion, for example a patient may be told to use a tuning fork to aid symptoms in a movement disorder.

Despite the understanding of psychogenic symptoms, it is not assumed that all medically unexplained illness must have a psychological cause. It remains possible that genetic, biochemical, electrophysiological, or other abnormalities may be present which we do not understand and cannot identify. Some patients may have their symptoms misdiagnosed as psychogenic even with a lack of concrete evidence to suggest there are psychological causes. Misdiagnoses of psychogenic disease may be accidental, or may arise intentionally due to bias or ignorance. For example a doctor with a bias towards men may tell women that their symptoms are psychogenic, despite actual symptoms of a physical disorder.

== See also ==
- Conversion disorder
- Functional symptom
- Functional neurological symptom disorder
- Habit cough
- Mass psychogenic illness
- Psychogenic amnesia
- Psychological trauma
- Psychoneuroimmunology
