= Conversion disorder =

Former psychiatric diagnosis

- Specialty: Psychiatry, neurology
- Symptoms: Numbness, weakness, movement problems, non-epileptic seizures, tremor, fainting, trouble speaking, impaired hearing and vision, trouble swallowing
- Risk factors: Long term stress
- Treatment: Cognitive behavioral therapy, medication, physical/occupational therapy

Conversion disorder (CD) was a formerly diagnosed psychiatric disorder characterized by abnormal sensory experiences and movement problems during periods of high psychological stress. Individuals diagnosed with CD presented with highly distressing neurological symptoms such as numbness, blindness, paralysis, or convulsions, none of which were consistent with a well-established organic cause and could be traced back to a psychological trigger. CD is no longer a diagnosis in the WHO's ICD-11 or APA's DSM-5 and was superseded by functional neurologic disorder (FND), a similar diagnosis that notably removed the requirement for a psychological stressor to be present.

It was thought that these symptoms arise in response to stressful situations affecting a patient's mental health. Individuals diagnosed with conversion disorder have a greater chance of experiencing certain psychiatric disorders including anxiety disorders, mood disorders, and personality disorders compared to those diagnosed with neurological disorders.

Conversion disorder was partly retained in the DSM-5-TR and ICD-11, but was renamed to functional neurological symptom disorder (FNSD) and dissociative neurological symptom disorder (DNSD), respectively. FNSD covers a similar range of symptoms found in conversion disorder, but does not include the requirements for a psychological stressor to be present. The new criteria no longer require feigning to be disproven before diagnosing FNSD. A fifth criterion describing a limitation in sexual functioning that was included in the DSM-IV was removed in the DSM-5 as well. The ICD-11 classifies DNSD as a dissociative disorder with unspecified neurological symptoms.

== Signs and symptoms ==
Conversion disorder presented with symptoms following exposure to a certain stressor, typically associated with trauma or psychological distress. Usually, the physical symptoms of the disorder affect the senses or movement. Common symptoms included blindness, partial or total paralysis, inability to speak, deafness, numbness, difficulty swallowing, incontinence, balance problems, non-epileptic seizures, tremors, and difficulty walking. Feelings of breathlessness were said to have possibly indicated conversion disorder or sleep paralysis.

Sleep paralysis and narcolepsy can be ruled out with sleep tests. These symptoms were attributed to conversion disorder when a medical explanation for the conditions cannot be found. Symptoms of conversion disorder usually occur suddenly. Conversion disorder was typically observed in people ages 10 to 35, affecting between 0.011% and 0.5% of the general population.

Conversion disorder presented motor or sensory symptoms including:

Motor symptoms or deficits:

- Impaired coordination or balance
- Weakness/paralysis of a limb or the entire body (hysterical paralysis or motor conversion disorders)
- Impairment or loss of speech (hysterical aphonia)
- Difficulty swallowing (dysphagia) or a sensation of a lump in the throat
- Urinary retention
- Psychogenic non-epileptic seizures or convulsions
- Persistent dystonia
- Tremor, myoclonus or other movement disorders
- Gait problems (astasia-abasia)
- Loss of consciousness (fainting)

Sensory symptoms or deficits:

- Impaired vision, double vision
- Impaired hearing
- Loss or disturbance of touch or pain sensation

Conversion symptoms typically do not conform to known anatomical pathways and physiological mechanisms. It has sometimes been stated that the presenting symptoms tend to reflect the patient's own understanding of anatomy and that the less medical knowledge a person has, the more implausible are the presenting symptoms. However, no systematic studies have yet been performed to substantiate this statement.

Sexual dysfunction and pain were also considered symptoms of conversion disorder, but if a patient only has these symptoms, they should be diagnosed with sexual pain disorder or pain disorder.

== Diagnosis ==
=== Definition ===
Conversion disorder is now partly contained under functional neurological symptom disorder (FNSD). In cases of conversion disorder, there is a psychological stressor.

=== Exclusion of neurological disease ===
Conversion disorder presents with symptoms that typically resemble a neurological disorder such as stroke, multiple sclerosis, epilepsy, hypokalemic periodic paralysis, or narcolepsy. The neurologist must carefully exclude neurological disease, through examination and appropriate investigations. However, it is not uncommon for patients with neurological disease to also have conversion disorder.

In excluding neurological disease, the neurologist has traditionally relied partly on the presence of positive signs of conversion disorder (i.e., certain aspects of the presentation that were thought to be rare in neurological disease but common in conversion disorder). The validity of many of these signs has been questioned by a study showing that they also occur in neurological disease. One such symptom, for example, is la belle indifférence, described in DSM-IV as "a relative lack of concern about the nature or implications of the symptoms". In a 2006 study, no evidence was found that patients with functional symptoms are any more likely to exhibit this than patients with a confirmed organic disease. In the DSM-5, la belle indifférence was removed as a diagnostic criterion.

Another feature thought to be important was that symptoms tended to be more severe on the non-dominant, usually left side of the body. There have been a number of theories about this, such as the relative involvement of cerebral hemispheres in emotional processing, or more simply, that it was "easier" to live with a functional deficit on the non-dominant side. However, a literature review of 121 studies established that this was not true, with publication bias the most likely explanation for this commonly held view. Although agitation is often assumed to be a positive sign of conversion disorder, release of epinephrine is a well-demonstrated cause of paralysis from hypokalemic periodic paralysis.

Misdiagnosis does sometimes occur. In a highly influential study from the 1960s, Eliot Slater demonstrated that misdiagnoses had occurred in one third of his 112 patients with conversion disorder. Later authors have argued that the paper was flawed. A 2005 meta-analysis has shown that misdiagnosis rates since that paper was published are around four percent, the same as for other neurological diseases.

=== Psychological mechanism ===
The psychological mechanism of conversion can be the most difficult aspect of a conversion disorder diagnosis. Even if there is a clear antecedent trauma or other possible psychological trigger, it is still not clear exactly how this gives rise to the symptoms observed. Patients with medically unexplained neurological symptoms may not have any psychological stressor, hence the use of the term "functional neurological symptom disorder" in the DSM-5, as opposed to "conversion disorder", and the DSM-5's removal of the need for a psychological trigger. The change of name in the DSM-5 also came with a change of criteria. There was a removal of connection to sexual functioning as well as relation to any other medical condition. There was also an added connection to social and occupational functioning.

== Treatment ==
Treatments for conversion disorder included hypnosis, psychotherapy, physical therapy, and stress management. Treatment plans will consider duration and presentation of symptoms and may include one or multiple of the above treatments. This may include the following:

1. Occupational therapy to maintain autonomy in activities of daily living.
2. Treatment of comorbid depression or anxiety if present.
3. Educating patients on the causes of their symptoms might help them learn to manage both the psychiatric and physical aspects of their condition. Psychological counseling is often warranted given the known relationship between conversion disorder and emotional trauma. This approach ideally takes place alongside other types of treatment.
4. Medications such as serotonin–norepinephrine reuptake inhibitors (SNRIs), a class of antidepressants, and sedatives such as benzodiazepines may help reduce stress and also relieve or prevent symptoms from occurring.

There is little evidence-based treatment of conversion disorder. Other treatments such as cognitive behavioral therapy (CBT), hypnosis, EMDR, psychodynamic psychotherapy, transcranial magnetic stimulation (TMS), virtual reality therapy, and EEG brain biofeedback need further trials. Psychoanalytic treatment may possibly be helpful. Most studies assessing the efficacy of these treatments are of poor quality and larger, better controlled studies are urgently needed. CBT is the most common treatment, with a 13% improvement rate.

== Prognosis ==
Empirical studies have found that the prognosis for conversion disorder varies widely, with some cases resolving in weeks, and others enduring for years or decades. Although patients may go into remission, they can relapse at any point.

== Epidemiology ==
=== Frequency ===
Information on the frequency of conversion disorder is limited, in part due to the complexities of the diagnostic process. In neurology clinics, the reported prevalence of unexplained symptoms among new patients is very high, between 30 and 60%. However, diagnosis of conversion disorder typically required an additional psychiatric evaluation, and since few patients will see a psychiatrist, it is unclear what proportion of the unexplained symptoms are actually due to the disorder. In 1976, large scale psychiatric registers in the U.S. and Iceland found incidence rates of 22 and 11 newly diagnosed cases per 100,000 person-years, respectively. In 2002, some estimates claim that in the general population, between 0.011% and 0.5% of the population have conversion disorder.

=== Culture ===
Although it is often thought that the frequency of conversion may be higher outside of the West, perhaps in relation to cultural and medical attitudes, evidence of this is limited. A 2007 community survey of urban Turkey found a prevalence of 5.6%. Many authors have found occurrence of conversion to be more frequent in rural, lower socio-economic groups, where technological investigation of patients is limited and people may know less about medical and psychological concepts.

=== Gender ===
In recent surveys of conversion disorder, females predominate, with between two and six female patients for every male. Some research suggests however that this gender disparity may be confounded by higher rates of violence against women.

=== Age ===
Conversion disorder may present at any age, but is rare in children younger than ten or in the elderly. Studies suggest a peak onset in the mid-to-late 30s.

== History ==
The first evidence of hysteria dates back to 1900 B.C., when the symptoms were blamed on the uterus moving within the female body ('wandering uterus'). The treatment varied "depending on the position of the uterus, which must be forced to return to its natural position. If the uterus had moved upwards, this could be done by placing malodorous and acrid substances near the woman's mouth and nostrils, while scented ones were placed near her vagina; on the contrary, if the uterus had lowered, the document recommends placing the acrid substances near her vagina and the perfumed ones near her mouth and nostrils."

In Greek mythology, hysteria, a similarly described condition, was thought to be caused by a lack of orgasms, uterine melancholy, and not procreating. Plato, Aristotle, and Hippocrates believed that a lack of sex causes complications in the uterus. Many Greeks believed it could be prevented and cured with wine and orgies. Hippocrates argued that a lack of regular sexual intercourse led to the uterus producing toxic fumes, causing it to move in the body. Therefore, he argued, all women should be married and enjoy a satisfactory sexual life.

Beginning in the 13th century, views on hysteria shifted from ancient medical theories (such as the wandering womb) to become heavily influenced by Christian theology. Hysteria was viewed as a malady of one's soul, being caused by sin, demonic influences, or satanic possession. Women with hysteria were exorcised, as it was believed that they were possessed by the devil. There was strong belief that if doctors could not find the cause of a disease or illness, it must be caused by the devil.

The 16th century brought a profound shift in the views of "hysteria," away from the demonic/supernatural explanations and back toward a natural and physical framework. At the beginning of the 16th century, women were still sexually stimulated by midwives in order to relieve their symptoms. Gerolamo Cardano and Giambattista della Porta later took a more medical stance, believing that polluted water and fumes caused the symptoms of hysteria. This allowed hysteria to be treated as a medical ailment rather than a spiritual failing.

In the mid-17th century, Thomas Willis introduced a new etiology of hysteria. He discovered that the brain and central nervous system were the cause of hysteria symptoms. Thomas Sydenham argued that the symptoms of hysteria may have an organic cause. He also proved the uterus is not the cause of symptoms. By the end of the 17th century, the etiology of "hysteria" was challenged due to a growing understanding of anatomical function, particularly in regards to the female 'wandering womb'. This was occurring particularly across Europe. Back in Colonial Massachusetts, Puritans clung deeply to a religious and supernatural view of "hysteria." In 1692, in the U.S. town of Salem, Massachusetts, there was a reported outbreak of hysteria. This led to the Salem witch trials, where women who were accused of being witches had symptoms such as sudden movements, staring eyes, and uncontrollable jumping.

Throughout the 18th century, hysteria was one of the most diagnosed nervous disorders throughout Europe. It was still viewed as a predominantly female disease, but the significant movement that had begun in the late 17th century continued. This was the shift in thinking of hysteria as being caused by the uterus to it being caused by the brain. In 1748, Joseph Raulin published a work defining hysteria as a "vaporous ailment," describing it as something caused by the poor air quality of large cities as well as the effects of unruly social lives. He theorized that hysteria defined as "affection vaporeuse" (vaporous ailment) could actually affect both sexes, but that women were more at risk due to their irritability and laziness.

In the 19th century, Jean-Martin Charcot argued that hysteria was caused by "a hereditary degeneration of the nervous system, namely a neurological disorder". Hysteria moved from being considered a neurological disorder to being considered a psychological disorder, when Pierre Janet argued that "dissociation appears autonomously for neurotic reasons, and in such a way as to adversely disturb the individual's everyday life". As early as 1874, doctors including W. B. Carpenter and J. A. Omerod began to speak out against the hysteria phenomenon as there was no evidence to prove its existence.

Sigmund Freud referred to the condition as both hysteria and conversion disorder throughout his career. He believed those with the condition could not live in a mature relationship, and that those with the condition were unwell in order to achieve a "secondary gain", in that they are able to manipulate their situation to fit their needs or desires. He also found that both men and women could have the disorder.

Freud's model suggested the emotional charge deriving from painful experiences would be consciously repressed as a way of managing the pain, but that the emotional charge would be somehow "converted" into neurological symptoms. Freud later argued that the repressed experiences were of a sexual nature. As Peter Halligan comments, conversion has "the doubtful distinction among psychiatric diagnoses of still invoking Freudian mechanisms".

Pierre Janet, a highly noted psychologist during the early 20th century, argued that symptoms arose through the power of suggestion, acting on a personality vulnerable to dissociation. In this hypothetical process, the subject's experience of their leg, for example, is split off from the rest of their consciousness, resulting in paralysis or numbness in that leg.

Some support for the Freudian model comes from findings of high rates of childhood sexual abuse in conversion patients. Support for the dissociation model comes from studies showing heightened suggestibility in patients with conversion disorder. Critics argue that it can be challenging to find organic pathologies for all symptoms, and so the practice of diagnosing patients with such symptoms as having hysteria led to the disorder being meaningless, vague and a sham diagnosis, as it does not refer to any definable disease.

Throughout its history, many patients have been misdiagnosed with hysteria or conversion disorder when they had organic disorders such as tumors, epilepsy, or vascular diseases. This has led to patient deaths, a lack of appropriate care, and suffering for the patients.

Eliot Slater, after studying the condition in the 1950s, stated: "The diagnosis of 'hysteria' is all too often a way of avoiding a confrontation with our own ignorance. This is especially dangerous when there is an underlying organic pathology, not yet recognised. In this penumbra we find patients who know themselves to be ill but, coming up against the blank faces of doctors who refuse to believe in the reality of their illness, proceed by way of emotional lability, overstatement and demands for attention ... Here is an area where catastrophic errors can be made. In fact it is often possible to recognise the presence though not the nature of the unrecognisable, to know that a man must be ill or in pain when all the tests are negative. But it is only possible to those who come to their task in a spirit of humility. In the main the diagnosis of 'hysteria' applies to a disorder of the doctor–patient relationship. It is evidence of non-communication, of a mutual misunderstanding ... We are, often, unwilling to tell the full truth or to admit to ignorance ... Evasions, even untruths, on the doctor's side are among the most powerful and frequently used methods he has for bringing about an efflorescence of 'hysteria'".

The onset of conversion disorder often correlates to a traumatic or stressful event. There are certain populations that are considered at risk for conversion disorder, including people with a medical illness or condition, people with personality disorders or dissociative disorders. No biomarkers have yet been found to support the idea that conversion disorder is caused by a psychiatric condition.

There has been much recent interest in using functional neuroimaging to study conversion. As researchers identify the mechanisms which underlie conversion symptoms, it is hoped they will enable the development of a neuropsychological model. A number of such studies have been performed, including some which suggest the blood-flow in patients' brains may be abnormal while they are unwell. The studies have all been too small to be confident of the generalisability of their findings, so no neuropsychological model has been clearly established.

An evolutionary psychology explanation for conversion disorder is that the symptoms may have been evolutionarily advantageous during warfare. A non-combatant with these symptoms signals non-verbally, possibly to someone speaking a different language, that she or he is not dangerous as a combatant and also may be carrying some form of dangerous infectious disease. This can explain that conversion disorder may develop following a threatening situation, that there may be a group effect with many people simultaneously developing similar symptoms, as in mass psychogenic illness, and the gender difference in prevalence.

== See also ==
- Body-centred countertransference
- Post-traumatic stress disorder (PTSD) and complex post-traumatic stress disorder (C-PTSD)
- Somatic symptom disorder
- Functional disorder
