= Plecanatide =

Pharmaceutical drug

Clinical data
- Trade names: Trulance, Plectide
- Other names: SP-304; H-Asn-Asp-Glu-Cys(1)-Glu-Leu-Cys(2)-Val-Asn-Val-Ala-Cys(1)-Thr-Gly-Cys(2)-Leu-OH
- License data: US DailyMed: Plecanatide; US FDA: Plecanatide
- Routes of administration: By mouth
- ATC code: A06AX07 (WHO)

Legal status
- Legal status: CA: ℞-only; US: ℞-only

Identifiers
- IUPAC name: L-Leucine, L-asparaginyl-L-α-aspartyl-L-α-glutamyl-L-cysteinyl-L-αglutamyl-L-leucyl-L-cysteinyl-L-valyl-L-asparaginyl-L-valyl-L-alanyl-L-cysteinyl-L-threonylglycyl-Lcysteinyl-, cyclic (4→12),(7→15)-bis(disulfide).
- CAS Number: 467426-54-6
- PubChem CID: 70693500
- IUPHAR/BPS: 9069
- DrugBank: DB13170
- ChemSpider: 28530494
- UNII: 7IK8Z952OK
- KEGG: D09948
- ChEMBL: ChEMBL2103867
- CompTox Dashboard (EPA): DTXSID60196933

Chemical and physical data
- Formula: C_{65}H_{104}N_{18}O_{26}S_{4}
- Molar mass: 1681.89 g·mol^{−1}
- 3D model (JSmol): Interactive image
- SMILES: CC1C(=O)NC2CSSCC(C(=O)NC(C(=O)NC(C(=O)NC(CSSCC(NC(=O)CNC(=O)C(NC2=O)C(C)O)C(=O)NC(CC(C)C)C(=O)O)C(=O)NC(C(=O)NC(C(=O)NC(C(=O)N1)C(C)C)CC(=O)N)C(C)C)CC(C)C)CCC(=O)O)NC(=O)C(CCC(=O)O)NC(=O)C(CC(=O)O)NC(=O)C(CC(=O)N)N
- InChI: InChI=1S/C65H104N18O26S4/c1-25(2)15-34-55(98)80-41-24-113-110-21-38(58(101)77-37(65(108)109)16-26(3)4)71-44(87)20-69-62(105)50(30(10)84)83-61(104)40(78-51(94)29(9)70-63(106)48(27(5)6)81-57(100)35(18-43(68)86)76-64(107)49(28(7)8)82-60(41)103)23-112-111-22-39(59(102)73-32(53(96)75-34)11-13-45(88)89)79-54(97)33(12-14-46(90)91)72-56(99)36(19-47(92)93)74-52(95)31(66)17-42(67)85/h25-41,48-50,84H,11-24,66H2,1-10H3,(H2,67,85)(H2,68,86)(H,69,105)(H,70,106)(H,71,87)(H,72,99)(H,73,102)(H,74,95)(H,75,96)(H,76,107)(H,77,101)(H,78,94)(H,79,97)(H,80,98)(H,81,100)(H,82,103)(H,83,104)(H,88,89)(H,90,91)(H,92,93)(H,108,109)/t29-,30+,31-,32-,33-,34-,35-,36-,37-,38-,39-,40-,41-,48-,49-,50-/m0/s1; Key:NSPHQWLKCGGCQR-DLJDZFDSSA-N

Plecanatide, sold under the brand name Trulance, is a medication for the treatment of chronic idiopathic constipation (CIC) and irritable bowel syndrome with constipation. It is available in India under the brand name Plectide (OQM Div, MSN Laboratories, India). Plecanatide is an agonist of guanylate cyclase-C. Plecanatide increases intestinal transit and fluid through a buildup of cGMP.

== Medical uses ==
As of January 2017, plecanatide is approved in the United States for the treatment of chronic idiopathic constipation in adults. later it was also approved for irritable bowel syndrome with constipation (IBS-C).

The presence of this condition is determined using the Rome III diagnostic criteria for chronic constipation which requires that the patient meet stool frequency, stool consistency, incomplete evacuation, and straining requirements in addition to not being a likely candidate for irritable bowel syndrome. The symptoms should also have been present for at least three of the last six months to establish the chronic nature of the condition before treatment with plecanatide is indicated.

Plecanatide has been shown to be safe and effective. It has shown to be at least equally as effective as its main competitor, linaclotide (brand name Linzess), but has been shown to have a lower rate of diarrhea as an adverse drug reaction.

== Dosage and administration ==
The recommended dosage of plecanatide is 3 mg taken by mouth once daily.

A plecanatide tablet can be taken with or without food and should be swallowed whole. For adults with swallowing difficulties, plecanatide tablets can be crushed and administered orally either in apple sauce or with water or administered with water via a nasogastric or gastric feeding tube.

== Contraindications ==
Plecanatide has not been shown to be safe or effective in persons 6 years to 18 years of age. Use of plecanatide by persons under the age of 6 poses a serious dehydration risk and studies have demonstrated plecanatide can cause death in juvenile mice due to this dehydrating effect.

Use of plecanatide is also contraindicated in persons who are suspected of having a mechanical gastrointestinal obstruction.

== Pharmacology ==
=== Structure and function ===
Plecanatide is a 16 amino acid peptide with the amino acid sequence:

H-Asn1-Asp2-Glu3-Cys4-Glu5-Leu6-Cys7-Val8-Asn9-Val10-Ala11-Cys12-Thr13-Gly14-Cys15-Leu16-OH

(one-letter sequence: NDECELCVNVACTGCL). Plecanatide is nearly structurally identical to human uroguanylin, apart from the substitution of Asp^{3} with Glu^{3}. Disulfide bonds exist between Cys^{4} and Cys^{12}, as well as Cys^{7} and Cys^{15}.

Plecanatide has two important motifs. The first being the acidic residues Asp^{2} and Glu^{3} which modulate the affinity for its receptor in response to environmental pH. Simulations predict the optimal activity of Plecanatide to occur at pH 5, making it suitable for targeting cells within the proximal intestine, which has a pH of between 5 and 6. The second is the ACTGC motif (residues Ala^{11} to Cys^{15}) which is the region responsible for its binding to the receptor, guanylate cyclase-C.

=== Mechanism of action ===
Plecanatide works as a laxative by drawing water in to the gastrointestinal tract thereby softening stool and encouraging its natural passage.

Similar to its endogenous counterpart, plecanatide activates guanylate cyclase-C on endothelial cells within the gastrointestinal tract. The activation of guanylate cyclase-C catalyses the production of the second messenger guanosine 3’,5’-cyclic monophosphate (cGMP) which leads to the protein kinase A (PKA) and protein kinase G II (PKGII)-mediated phosphorylation of the cystic fibrosis transmembrane conductance regulator (CFTR) protein. CFTR is an anion channel and upon activation it will secrete negatively charged ions, particularly chloride (Cl^{−}) and bicarbonate (HCO_{3}^{−}) in to the GI tract lumen. This disruption to the electrochemical gradient is in part rectified by the passive secretion of positively charged sodium ions in to the lumen and water follows by osmosis.

Plecanatide is also known to have an anti-nociceptive effect in animal models, however the exact mechanism of action is not yet fully elucidated. It has been suggested that this may be in part to the anti-inflammatory action of guanylate cyclase-C by its inhibition of pro-inflammatory cytokines, or through the inhibition of associated sensory neurons.

=== Pharmacokinetics and metabolism ===
As plecanatide acts on receptors present on the apical side of endothelial cells lining the gastrointestinal tract it is able to impart its effect without ever entering circulation. As with most orally ingested peptides, plecanatide is degraded by intestinal enzymes, and so very little of the active drug enters systemic circulation. Minimal amounts of the drug are expected to be transported in to the body, and concentrations of plecanatide and its metabolites are undetectable in plasma following the recommended dosage of 3 mg. It has also been shown that dosages up to 48.6 mg produced no detectable concentration of plecanatide in human plasma at any time point after ingestion.
