= Neurological disorder =

Any disorder of the nervous system

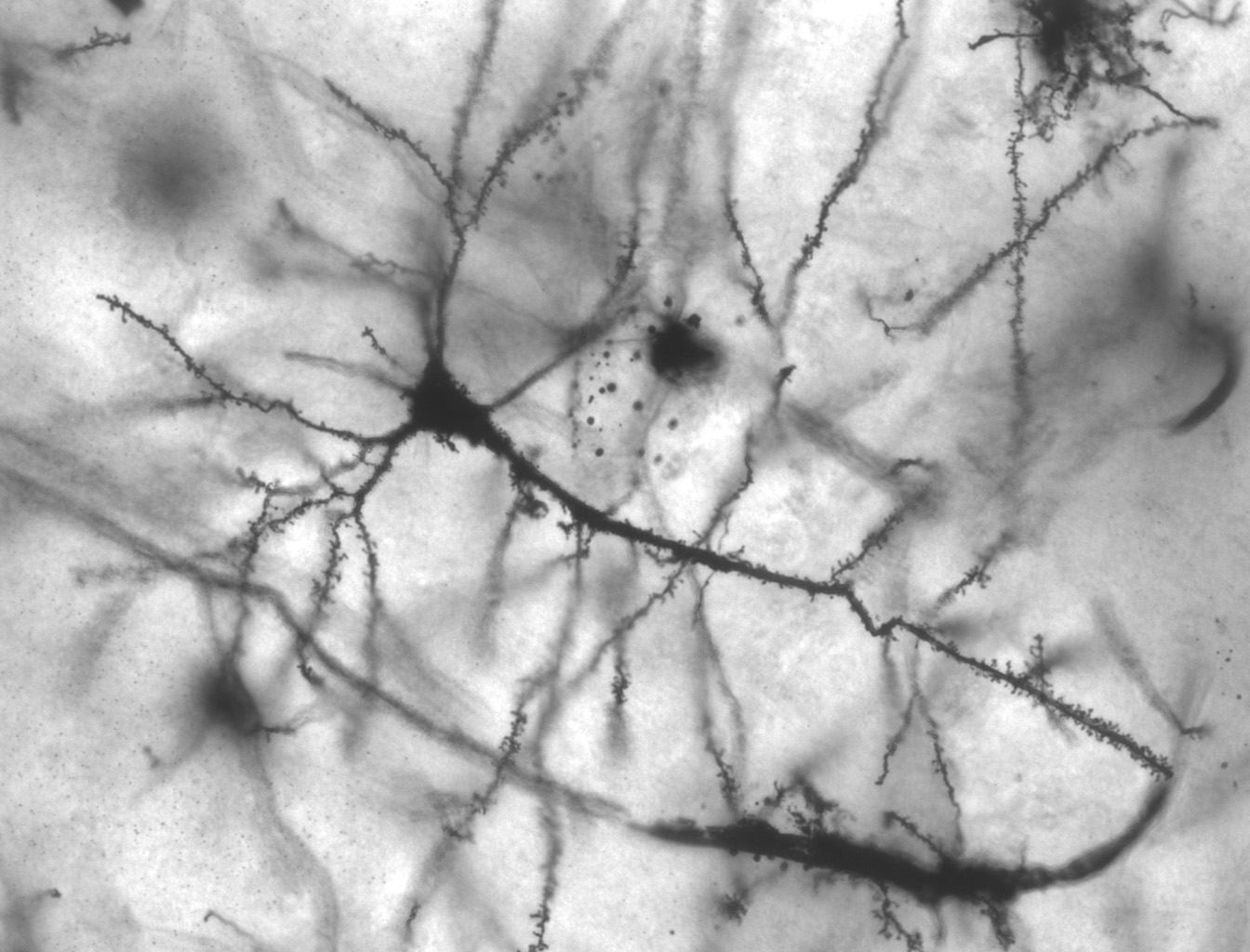
- Neurons in person with epilepsy, 40x magnified
- Specialty: Neurology

A neurological disorder is any disorder of the nervous system. Structural, biochemical or electrical abnormalities in the brain, spinal cord, or other nerves can result in a range of symptoms. Examples of symptoms include paralysis, muscle weakness, poor coordination, loss of sensation, seizures, confusion, pain, tauopathies, and altered levels of consciousness. There are many recognized neurological disorders; some are relatively common, but many are rare.

Interventions for neurological disorders include preventive measures, lifestyle changes, physiotherapy or other therapy, neurorehabilitation, pain management, medication, operations performed by neurosurgeons, or a specific diet. The World Health Organization estimated in 2006 that neurological disorders and their sequelae (direct consequences) affect as many as one billion people worldwide and identified health inequalities and social stigma/discrimination as major factors contributing to the associated disability and their impact.

== Causes ==
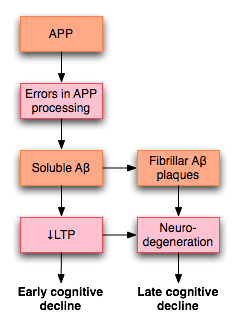
Part of the causal chain leading to Alzheimer's disease

Although the brain and spinal cord are surrounded by tough membranes, enclosed in the bones of the skull and spinal vertebrae, and chemically protected by the blood-brain barrier, they are very susceptible if compromised. Nerves tend to lie deep under the skin but can still become exposed to damage. Individual neurons, the neural circuits, and the nerves into which they form are susceptible to electrochemical and structural disruption. Neuroregeneration may occur in the peripheral nervous system and thus overcome or work around injuries to some extent, but it is thought to be rare in the brain and spinal cord.

The specific causes of neurological problems vary but can include genetic disorders, congenital abnormalities or disorders, infections, lifestyle and environmental health problems such as malnutrition and pollution, brain damage, spinal cord injury, nerve injury, and gluten sensitivity (with or without intestinal damage or digestive symptoms). Metal poisoning, where metals accumulate in the human body and disrupt biological processes, has been reported to induce neurological problems, at least in the case of lead. The neurological problem may start in another body system that interacts with the nervous system. For example, cerebrovascular disease involves brain injury due to problems with the blood vessels (cardiovascular system) supplying the brain; autoimmune disorders involve damage caused by the body's own immune system; lysosomal storage diseases such as Niemann–Pick disease can lead to neurological deterioration. The National Institute for Health and Care Excellence recommends considering the evaluation of underlying coeliac disease in people with unexplained neurological symptoms, particularly peripheral neuropathy or ataxia.

In a substantial minority of cases of neurological symptoms, no neurological cause can be identified using current testing procedures, and such "idiopathic" conditions can invite different theories about what is occurring. Generally speaking, a substantial number of neurological disorders may have originated from a previous clinically not recognized viral infection. For example, it is thought that infection with the Hepatitis E virus, which is often initially asymptomatic may provoke neurological disorders, but there are many other examples as well.

Numerous examples have been described of neurological disorders that are associated with mutated DNA repair genes (for reviews see). Inadequate repair of DNA damages can lead directly to cell death and neuron depletion as well as disruptions in the pattern of epigenetic alterations required for normal neuronal function.

=== DNA damage ===
Neurons are highly oxygenated cells and as a consequence DNA damage caused by chronic exposure to endogenous reactive oxygen species is a substantial challenge for neurons. Germline mutations deficient in the repair of DNA damages cause neuronal dysfunction and are etiologically linked to many neurological disorders. For example, the neurological disorders, amyotrophic lateral sclerosis (ALS) and frontotemporal dementia (FTD) are linked to DNA damage accumulation and DNA repair deficiency.

== Classification ==
Deaths due to neurological conditions per million persons 2012 18–52 53–68 69–84 85–99 100–131 132-157 158-186 187-243 244-477 478-1,482

Neurological disorders can be categorized according to the primary location affected, the primary type of dysfunction involved, or the primary type of cause. The broadest division is between central nervous system disorders and peripheral nervous system disorders. The Merck Manual lists brain, spinal cord disorders, and nerve disorders in the following overlapping categories:

Nervous system
- Human nervous system

Identifiers
- MeSH: D009422

- Brain:
  - Brain dysfunction according to type:
    - Apraxia (patterns or sequences of movements)
    - Agnosia (identifying things or people)
    - Amnesia (memory)
    - Aphasia (language)
    - Dysarthria (speech)
- Spinal cord disorders
- Peripheral nervous system disorders (e.g., Peripheral neuropathy)
- Cranial nerve disorder (e.g., trigeminal neuralgia)
- Autonomic nervous system disorders (e.g., dysautonomia, multiple system atrophy)
- Epilepsy
- Movement disorders of the central and peripheral nervous system such as Parkinson's disease, essential tremor, amyotrophic lateral sclerosis (ALS), and Tourette syndrome
- Sleep disorders (e.g., narcolepsy)
- Some speech disorders (e.g., stuttering)
- Headaches (e.g., migraine, cluster headache, tension headache)
- Pain (e.g., complex regional pain syndrome, fibromyalgia)
- Delirium
- Dementia (e.g., Alzheimer's disease)
- Coma and impaired consciousness, (e.g., stupor)
- Stroke
- Tumors of the nervous system (e.g., cancer)
- Multiple sclerosis and other demyelinating diseases
- Brain infections
- Meningitis
- Prion diseases (a type of infectious agent)

Neurological disorders in non-human animals are treated by veterinarians.

== Treatments ==
There are a wide range of treatments for neurological disorders from surgery to neural rehabilitation. Neurotherapy relies on knowledge from traditional medicine and uses a scientific approach and evidence-based practice. Some of its methods are non-invasive. Neurotherapy is a medical treatment that involves the targeted systemic administration of an energetic stimulus or chemical agent to a specific neurological area. Some neuromodulation techniques are still considered alternative medicine (medical procedures that are not easily integrated into the mainstream healthcare model) due to their novelty and lack of supporting evidence. The wide range of neurotherapy methods can be divided into four domains depending on the use of energy stimulation: acoustic energy, electric energy, electromagnetic radiation, and magnetic energy.

== Mental functioning ==
A neurological examination can, to some extent, assess the impact of neurological damage and disease on brain function in terms of behavior, memory, or cognition. Behavioral neurology specializes in this area. In addition, clinical neuropsychology uses neuropsychological assessment to precisely identify and track problems in mental functioning, usually after some sort of brain injury or neurological impairment.

Alternatively, a condition might first be detected through the presence of abnormalities in mental functioning, and further assessment may indicate an underlying neurological disorder. There are sometimes unclear boundaries in the distinction between disorders treated within neurology, and mental disorders treated within the other medical specialty of psychiatry, or other mental health professions such as clinical psychology. In practice, cases may present as one type, but be assessed as more appropriate to the other. Neuropsychiatry deals with mental disorders arising from specific identified diseases of the nervous system.

One area that can be contested is in cases of idiopathic neurological symptoms - conditions where the cause cannot be established. It can be decided in some cases, perhaps by exclusion of any accepted diagnosis, that higher-level brain/mental activity is causing symptoms, referred to as functional symptoms, rather than the symptoms originating in the area of the nervous system from which they may appear to originate. Cases involving these symptoms are classified as functional disorders ("functional" in this context is usually contrasted with the old term "organic disease"). For example, in functional neurologic disorder (FND), those affected present with various neurological symptoms such as functional seizures, numbness, paresthesia, and weakness, among others. Such cases may be contentiously interpreted as being "psychological" rather than "neurological." If the onset functional symptoms appear to be causally linked to emotional states or responses to social stress or social contexts, it may be referred to as conversion disorder.

On the other hand, dissociation refers to partial or complete disruption of the integration of a person's conscious functioning, such that a person may feel detached from one's emotions, body and/or immediate surroundings. In extreme cases, this may be diagnosed as depersonalization-derealization disorder. There are also conditions viewed as neurological where a person appears to consciously register neurological stimuli that cannot possibly be coming from the part of the nervous system to which they would normally be attributed, such as phantom pain or synesthesia, or where limbs act without conscious direction, as in alien hand syndrome.

Some of the fields that contribute to understanding mental functioning

Conditions that are classed as mental disorders, learning disabilities, and forms of intellectual disability, are not themselves usually dealt with as neurological disorders. Biological psychiatry seeks to understand mental disorders in terms of their basis in the nervous system, however. In clinical practice, mental disorders are usually indicated by a mental state examination, or other type of structured interview or questionnaire process. At the present time, neuroimaging (brain scans) alone cannot accurately diagnose a mental disorder or tell the risk of developing one; however, it can be used to rule out other medical conditions such as a brain tumor. In research, neuroimaging and other neurological tests can show correlations between reported and observed mental difficulties and certain aspects of neural function or differences in brain structure. In general, numerous fields intersect to try to understand the basic processes involved in mental functioning, many of which are brought together in cognitive science. The distinction between neurological and mental disorders can be a matter of some debate, either in regard to specific facts about the cause of a condition or in regard to the general understanding of brain and mind.

== See also ==
- Central nervous system
- European Brain Council
- Human brain
- Mental disorder
- Neuroplasticity
- Peripheral nervous system
- Proctalgia fugax
- Hypokalemic sensory overstimulation
