= Ironwood Pharmaceuticals =

American pharmaceutical company

Ironwood Pharmaceuticals, Inc.
- Type: Public
- Traded as: Nasdaq: IRWD (Class A); Russell 2000 Component
- Founded: 1998; 28 years ago
- Headquarters: Boston, Massachusetts
- Website: ironwoodpharma.com

Ironwood Pharmaceuticals, Inc. is a publicly traded pharmaceutical company. It was originally called Microbia, Inc.

Microbia was founded by postdocs from the lab of Gerald Fink at the Whitehead Institute to commercialize approaches that had been developed in the lab to improve industrial fermentation of fungi, to genetically engineer them to produce secondary metabolites more efficiently or to produce new ones as leads for drug discovery or as products for use in industry, and to identify drug targets in fungi for antifungal drug discovery. In 2002 the company hired John Talley to lead their antifungal drug discovery efforts, which at the time were focused on identifying small molecules that could inhibit fungal invasins, along with Mark Currie who had also worked at Searle division of Monsanto with Talley, and then had gone to Sepracor, and also Richard Bailey, who had run Monsanto's nutritional business. Currie directed the efforts that led to the discovery of linaclotide, which was based on an enterotoxin produced by some strains of Escherichia coli that cause traveler's diarrhea.

By 2004 the company had raised $99M and was preparing a Phase I trial for linaclotide. By 2006 Microbia was starting to struggle with the different challenges and expenses of drug development, along with its industrial fermentation business and drug discovery efforts, and made the decision to split in two, with "Microbia Precision Engineering" focused on industrial applications led by Bailey and Microbia focused on drug discovery and development. Tate & Lyle invested $7M in the Microbia spinout and took a board seat in 2006. Microbia changed its name to Ironwood in 2008 and shortened the name of the industrial business to Microbia.

By 2009, Ironwood had raised a total of $281M. In early 2010 Ironwood held its IPO, which priced at $11.25 a share, below the target price of $14. Later that year it sold its interests in Microbia to DSM for an undisclosed sum.

Linaclotide (Linzess in the US and Mexico, and as Constella elsewhere), a drug used to treat irritable bowel syndrome with constipation and chronic constipation with no known cause, was approved in the US and Europe in 2012. Most of the marketing rights were licensed to Allergan and Astellas.

It was developing a drug called IW-9179 or recanaclotide but abandoned it in 2016.

Soclenicant (BNC-210; IW-2143) is an anxiolytic that Ironwood licensed and performed R&D on and then abandoned.

In April 2018, the shares of Ironwood Pharmaceuticals closed up more than 10 percent on the news of biotech activist investor, Alex Denner joining its board.

Despite having a billion dollar drug in Linzess, Ironwood - through a series of confounding decisions by management - has seen its stock price crater from a high of $21.16 on July 17, 2018, to its current price of 77 CENTS at the close of trading on August 1, 2025.
