= Joseph Raulin =

French physician (1708–1784)

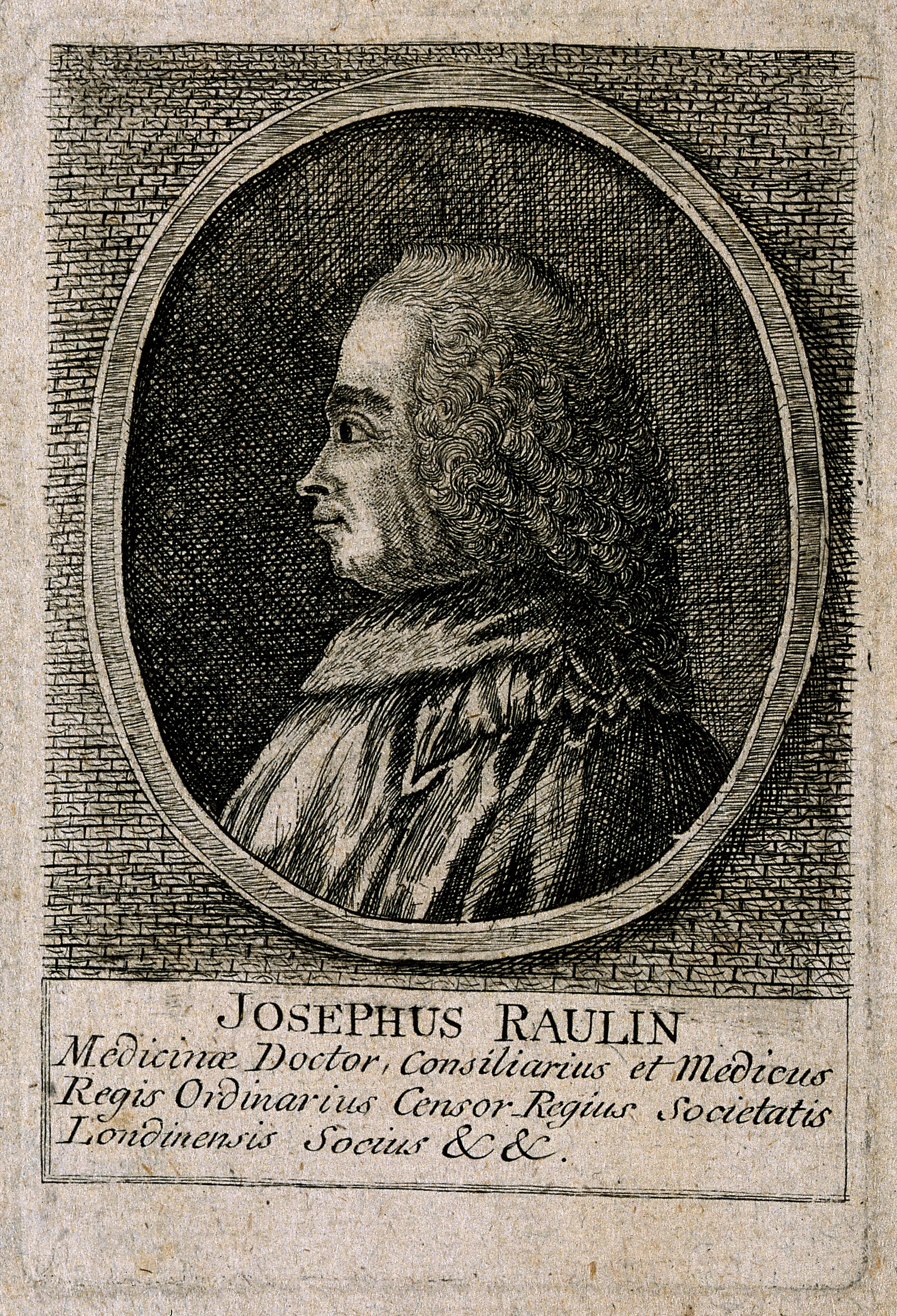
Joseph Raulin. Line engraving.

Joseph Raulin (1708–1784) was a French physician.

== Biography ==
Raulin was born in Ayguetinte in 1708 and died in Paris the 12th of April 1784. He was a French obstetrician, and physician for King Louis XV. He graduated from the Faculty of Medicine in Bordeaux, before becoming physician for the king and royal censor. Due to his position as head physician, he inherited the role of intendant over mineral waters.

He was member of the Royal Society in London from 1763 and professor of medicine at the Collège Royal from 1776. He is the author of several books on gynaecology and obstetrics, of which some were translated into several languages.

He was also the author of legislation and works on the mineral waters of France, the most famous of which being his medical and chemical description of the mineral waters sold in Paris.

== Works ==
- Des Maladies occasionnées par les promptes et fréquentes variations de l'air considéré comme atmosphère terrestre, avec l'explication méchanique de leurs principaux symptômes et la méthode de les guérir (1752)
- Observations de médecine, où l'on trouve des remarques qui tendent à détruire le préjugé où l'on est sur l'usage du lait dans la pulmonie, avec une Dissertation sur les ingrédiens de l'air (1754)
- Traité des maladies occasionnées par les excès de chaleur, de froid, d'humidité et autres intempéries de l'air, avec la méthode de les guérir (1756)
- Traité des affections vaporeuses du sexe, avec l'exposition de leurs symptômes, de leurs différentes causes, et la méthode de les guérir (1758)
- Traité des fleurs blanches, avec la méthode de les guérir (2 volumes, 1766)
- De la Conservation des enfants, ou les Moyens de les fortifier, depuis l'instant de leur existence, jusqu'à l'âge de puberté (3 volumes, 1768-1769)
- Observations sur l'usage des eaux minérales de Pougues (1769)
- Instructions succinctes sur les accouchements en faveur des sages-femmes des provinces, faites par ordre du ministère (1770)
- Traité des maladies des femmes en couche, avec la méthode de les guérir à PARIS Chez Vincent 1771
- Traité des eaux minérales de Verdusan, connues sous le nom d'eaux minérales de Castera Vivent, avec leur analyse, leurs propriétés et leur usage dans les maladies (1772)
- Traité analytique des eaux minérales en général, de leurs propriétés et de leur usage dans les maladies (2 volumes, 1772-1774)
- Examen de la houille considérée comme engrais des terres (1775)
- Exposition succincte des principes et des propriétés des eaux minérales, qu'on distribue au bureau général de Paris (1775)
- Parallèle des eaux minérales d'Allemagne que l'on transporte en France et de celles de la même nature qui sourdent dans le royaume avec des remarques sur l'analyse des eaux minérales en général (1777)
- Analyse des eaux minérales spathico-martiales de Provins, avec leurs propriétés dans les maladies (1778)
- Nouvelles observations sur la phtisie pulmonaire (1784)
