= Functional symptom =

Medical symptom with no known physical cause

A functional symptom is a medical symptom with no known physical cause. In other words, there is no structural or pathologically defined disease to explain the symptom. The use of the term 'functional symptom' does not assume psychogenesis, only that the body is not functioning as expected. Functional symptoms are increasingly viewed within a framework in which 'biological, psychological, interpersonal and healthcare factors' should all be considered to be relevant for determining the aetiology and treatment plans.

Historically, there has often been fierce debate about whether certain problems are predominantly related to an abnormality of structure (disease) or are psychosomatic in nature (secondary gain), and what are at one stage posited to be functional symptoms are sometimes later reclassified as organic, as investigative techniques improve. It is well established that psychosomatic symptoms are a real phenomenon, so this potential explanation is often plausible, however the commonality of a range of psychological symptoms and functional weakness does not imply that one causes the other. For example, symptoms associated with migraine, epilepsy, schizophrenia, multiple sclerosis, stomach ulcers, myalgic encephalomyelitis/chronic fatigue syndrome (ME/CFS), Lyme disease and many other conditions have all tended historically at first to be explained largely as physical manifestations of the patient's psychological state of mind; until such time as new physiological knowledge is eventually gained. Another specific example is functional constipation, which may have psychological or psychiatric causes. However, one type of apparently functional constipation, anismus, may have a neurological (physical) basis.

This is also an issue when the patient is involved in litigation such as injuries from motor vehicle accidents or work injuries involving workers compensation benefits and disputes. Studies have shown that unsettled claims affect level of complaints and many medical studies do not include data from cases where outcomes may have been tainted by inclusion of patients involved in worker's compensation cases.

Whilst misdiagnosis of functional symptoms does occur, in neurology, for example, this appears to occur no more frequently than of other neurological or psychiatric syndromes. However, in order to be quantified, misdiagnosis has to be recognized as such, which can be problematic in such a challenging field as medicine.

A common trend is to see functional symptoms and syndromes such as fibromyalgia, irritable bowel syndrome and functional neurological symptoms such as functional weakness as symptoms in which both biological and psychological factors are relevant, without one necessarily being dominant.

== Weakness ==
Functional weakness is weakness of an arm or leg without evidence of damage or a disease of the nervous system. Patients with functional weakness experience symptoms of limb weakness which can be disabling and frightening such as problems walking or a 'heaviness' down one side, dropping things or a feeling that a limb just doesn't feel normal or 'part of them'. Functional weakness may also be described as functional neurological symptom disorder (FNsD), Functional Neurological Disorder (FND) or functional neurological symptoms. If the symptoms are caused by a psychological trigger, it may be diagnosed as 'dissociative motor disorder' or conversion disorder (CD).

To the patient and the doctor it often looks as if there has been a stroke or have symptoms of multiple sclerosis. However, unlike these conditions, with functional weakness there is no permanent damage to the nervous system which means that it can get better or even go away completely.

The diagnosis should usually be made by a consultant neurologist so that other neurological causes can be excluded. The diagnosis should be made on the basis of positive features in the history and the examination (such as Hoover's sign). It is dangerous to make the diagnosis simply because tests are normal. Neurologists usually diagnose wrongly about 5% of the time (which is the same for many other conditions.)

The most effective treatment is physiotherapy, however it is also helpful for patients to understand the diagnosis, and some may find CBT helps them to cope with the emotions associated with being unwell. For those with conversion disorder, psychological therapy is key to their treatment as it is emotional or psychological factors which are causing their symptoms.

=== Giveway weakness ===
Giveway weakness (also "give-away weakness", "collapsing weakness", etc.) refers to a symptom where a patient's arm, leg, can initially provide resistance against an examiner's touch, but then suddenly "gives way" and provides no further muscular resistance. It can also be seen if the examinee is not cooperating with the exam and does not produce a full effort. This may sometimes be associated with secondary gain from being injured.

== See also ==
- Functional disorder
- Functional neurological symptom disorder
- Idiopathy
