= Functional neurological symptom disorder =

Disorder impairing normal brain function

- Other names: Dissociative neurological symptom disorder, functional neurologic disorder, functional neurological disorder
- Specialty: Neurology, psychiatry, clinical psychology
- Symptoms: Numbness, weakness, non-epileptic seizures, tremor, movement problems, trouble speaking, fatigue
- Usual onset: Ages 20 to 40
- Risk factors: Long term stress, psychological trauma
- Differential diagnosis: Multiple sclerosis
- Treatment: Counseling, physical therapy, occupational therapy

Functional neurological symptom disorder (FNSD), also referred to as dissociative neurological symptom disorder (DNSD), is a condition in which patients experience neurological symptoms such as weakness, movement problems, sensory symptoms, and convulsions. As a functional disorder, there is, by definition, no known disease process affecting the structure of the body, yet the person experiences symptoms relating to their body function. Symptoms of functional neurological disorders are clinically recognizable, but are not categorically associated with a definable organic disease.

The intended contrast is with an organic brain syndrome, in which a pathology (disease process) affecting the body's physiology can be identified. The diagnosis is made based on positive signs and symptoms noted in the history and on examination during the consultation with a neurologist.

Physiotherapy can be helpful for patients with motor symptoms (e.g., weakness, problems with gait, movement disorders), and there is evidence that tailored cognitive behavioural therapy can be helpful for patients with non-epileptic seizures.

== Signs and symptoms ==
There are a great number of symptoms experienced by those with a functional neurological disorder. While these symptoms are very real, their origin is complex, since it can be associated with severe psychological trauma and idiopathic neurological dysfunction. The core symptoms are those of motor or sensory dysfunction or episodes of altered awareness:

- Limb weakness or paralysis
- Non-epileptic seizures – these may look like epileptic seizures or faints
- Movement disorders including tremors, dystonia (spasms), myoclonus (jerky movements)
- Visual symptoms including loss of vision or double vision
- Speech symptoms including dysphonia (whispering speech), slurred or stuttering speech
- Sensory disturbance, including hemisensory syndrome (altered sensation down one side of the body)
- Numbness or inability to sense touch
- Dizziness and balance problems
- Dysfunction of regulation of body temperature and sensitivity such as cold or heat intolerance
- Pain (including chronic migraines)
- Extreme slowness and fatigue

== Causes ==
A systematic review found that stressful life events and childhood neglect were significantly more common in patients with FNSD than the general population, although some patients report no stressors. Converging evidence from several studies using different techniques and paradigms has now demonstrated distinctive brain activation patterns associated with functional deficits, unlike those seen in actors simulating similar deficits. The new findings advance current understanding of the mechanisms involved in this disease, and offer the possibility of identifying markers of the condition and patients' prognosis.

Recent studies on FND patients using functional magnetic resonance imaging (fMRI) reported differences in resting-state brain connectivity involving sensory, motor, and cognitive control networks. Other fMRI studies found reduced neural activation and coactivation in the anterior insula and dorsal anterior cingulate cortex. These findings expand current knowledge of FND, suggesting abnormalities in brain networks when processing bodily signals, along with trauma, may be linked to FND movement and cognitive symptoms, and dissociative difficulties.

FNSD has been reported as a rare occurrence in the period following general anesthesia.

== Diagnosis ==
A diagnosis of a functional neurological disorder is dependent on positive features from the history and examination.

Positive features of functional weakness on examination include Hoover's sign, when there is weakness of hip extension, which normalizes with contralateral hip flexion. Signs of functional tremor include entrainment and distractibility. The patient with tremor should be asked to copy rhythmical movements with one hand or foot. If the tremor of the other hand entrains to the same rhythm, stops, or if the patient has trouble copying a simple movement, this may indicate a functional tremor. Functional dystonia usually presents with an inverted ankle posture or clenched fist. Positive features of dissociative or non-epileptic seizures include prolonged motionless unresponsiveness, long-duration episodes (>2 minutes), and symptoms of dissociation prior to the attack. These signs can be usefully discussed with patients when the diagnosis is being made.

Patients with functional movement disorders and limb weakness may experience symptom onset triggered by an episode of acute pain, a physical injury, or physical trauma. They may also experience symptoms when faced with a psychological stressor, but this isn't the case for most patients. Patients with functional neurological disorders are more likely to have a history of another illness, such as irritable bowel syndrome, chronic pelvic pain, or fibromyalgia, but this cannot be used to make a diagnosis.

FNSD does not show up on blood tests or structural brain imaging, such as magnetic resonance imaging (MRI) or CT scanning. However, this is also the case for many other neurological conditions, so negative investigations should not be used alone to make the diagnosis. FNSD can occur alongside other neurological diseases and tests may show non-specific abnormalities which cause confusion for doctors and patients.

=== DSM-5 diagnostic criteria ===
The DSM-5 defines an acute episode of functional neurological symptom disorder as symptoms lasting less than six months, while a persistent episode includes symptoms for more than six months. FNSD can also have the specifier of with or without the psychological stressor.

=== Associated conditions ===
Epidemiological studies and meta-analysis have shown higher rates of depression and anxiety in patients with FNSD compared to the general population, but rates are similar to those of patients with other neurological disorders, such as epilepsy or Parkinson's disease. This is often the case because of years of misdiagnosis and accusations of malingering. Multiple sclerosis has some overlapping symptoms with FNSD, potentially a source of misdiagnosis.

== Treatment ==
A multi-disciplinary approach to treating functional neurological disorder is recommended. Treatment options can include:

- Cognitive behavioral therapy (CBT) can help a person modify their thought patterns to change emotions, mood, or behavior
- Physiotherapy and occupational therapy

Physiotherapy with someone who understands functional disorders may be the initial treatment of choice for patients with motor symptoms such as weakness, gait (walking) disorders, and movement disorders. Nielsen et al. reviewed the medical literature on physiotherapy for functional motor disorders up to 2012 and concluded that, although limited, the available studies mainly report positive results.

For many patients with FNSD, accessing treatment can be difficult. Availability of expertise is limited, and they may feel that they are being dismissed or told "it's all in your head," especially if psychological input is part of the treatment plan. Some medical professionals are uncomfortable explaining and treating patients with functional symptoms. Changes in diagnostic criteria, increasing evidence, literature on how to make the diagnosis and explain it, and changes in medical training are slowly changing this.

=== Controversy ===
Wessely and White have argued that FNSD may merely be an unexplained somatic symptom disorder. FNSD remains a stigmatized condition in the healthcare setting.

== Prevalence ==
Non-epileptic seizures account for about 1 in 7 referrals to neurologists after an initial episode, while functional weakness has a similar prevalence to multiple sclerosis.

== History ==
Functional neurologic disorder, is a more recent and inclusive term for what is sometimes referred to as conversion disorder. Throughout its history, many patients have been misdiagnosed with conversion disorder when they had organic disorders such as tumors, epilepsy, or vascular diseases. This has led to patient deaths, a lack of appropriate care and suffering for the patients. There is a growing understanding that symptoms are real and distressing, and are caused by an incorrect functioning of the brain rather than being imagined or feigned.

== See also ==
- Psychogenic disease
- Conversion disorder
