= Functional disorder =

Medical condition that impairs normal functioning of bodily processes

Functional disorders are a group of recognisable medical conditions which are due to changes to the functioning of the systems of the body rather than due to a disease affecting the structure of the body.

Functional disorders are common and complex phenomena that pose challenges to medical systems. Traditionally in medicine, the body is thought of as consisting of different organ systems, but it is less well understood how the systems interconnect or communicate. Functional disorders can affect the interplay of several organ systems (for example gastrointestinal, respiratory, musculoskeletal or neurological) leading to multiple and variable symptoms. Less commonly there is a single prominent symptom or organ system affected.

Most symptoms that are caused by structural disease can also be caused by a functional disorder. Because of this, individuals often undergo many medical investigations before the diagnosis is clear. Though research is growing to support explanatory models of functional disorders, structural scans such as MRIs, or laboratory investigation such as blood tests do not usually explain the symptoms or the symptom burden. This difficulty in 'seeing' the processes underlying the symptoms of functional disorders has often resulted in these conditions being misunderstood and sometimes stigmatised within medicine and society.

Despite being associated with high disability, functional symptoms are not a threat to life, and are considered modifiable with appropriate treatment.

== Definition ==
Functional disorders are a group of conditions characterised by persistent and often distressing symptoms that lead to significant impairment or disability. Unlike structural diseases, where clear abnormalities of organs or tissues can be identified, functional disorders are primarily understood as disturbances in the functioning and communication of body systems. Their pathophysiological basis often reflects dysregulation across neural, autonomic, endocrine, and immune pathways, shaped by interactions between biological, psychological, and social factors.

=== Examples ===
There are many different functional disorder diagnoses that might be given depending on the symptom or syndrome that is most troublesome. There are many examples of symptoms that individuals may experience; some of these include persistent or recurrent pain, fatigue, weakness, shortness of breath or bowel problems. Single symptoms may be assigned a diagnostic label, such as "functional chest pain", "functional constipation" or "functional seizures". Characteristic collections of symptoms might be described as one of the functional somatic syndromes. A syndrome is a collection of symptoms. Somatic means 'of the body'. Examples of functional somatic syndromes include: irritable bowel syndrome; cyclic vomiting syndrome; some persistent fatigue and chronic pain syndromes, such as fibromyalgia (chronic widespread pain), or chronic pelvic pain; interstitial cystitis; functional neurologic disorder; and multiple chemical sensitivity.

== Overlap ==
Most medical specialties define their own functional somatic syndrome, and a patient may end up with several of these diagnoses without understanding how they are connected. There is overlap in symptoms between all the functional disorder diagnoses. For example, it is not uncommon to have a diagnosis of irritable bowel syndrome (IBS) and chronic widespread pain/fibromyalgia. All functional disorders share risk factors and factors that contribute to their persistence. Increasingly researchers and clinicians are recognising the relationships between these syndromes.

== Classification ==
The terminology for functional disorders has been fraught with confusion and controversy, with many different terms used to describe them. Sometimes functional disorders are equated or mistakenly confused with diagnoses like category of "somatoform disorders", "medically unexplained symptoms", "psychogenic symptoms" or "conversion disorders". Many historical terms are now no longer thought of as accurate, and are considered by many to be stigmatising.

Psychiatric illnesses have historically also been considered as functional disorders in some classification systems, as they often fulfil the criteria above. Whether a given medical condition is termed a functional disorder depends in part on the state of knowledge. Some diseases, such as epilepsy, were historically categorized as functional disorders but are no longer classified that way.

== Prevalence ==
Functional disorders can affect individuals of all ages, ethnic groups and socioeconomic backgrounds. In clinical populations, functional disorders are common and have been found to present in around one-third of consultations in both specialist practice and primary care. Chronic courses of disorders are common and are associated with high disability, health-care usage and social costs.

Rates differ in the clinical population compared with the general population, and will vary depending on the criteria used to make the diagnosis. For example, irritable bowel syndrome is thought to affect 4.1%, and fibromyalgia 0.2–11.4% of the global population.

A recent large study carried out on population samples in Denmark showed the following: In total, 16.3% of adults reported symptoms fulfilling the criteria for at least one Functional Somatic Syndrome, and 16.1% fulfilled criteria for Bodily Distress Syndrome.

== Diagnosis ==
The diagnosis of functional disorders is usually made in the healthcare setting most often by a doctor — this could be a primary care physician or family doctor, hospital physician or specialist in the area of psychosomatic medicine or a consultant-liaison psychiatrist. The primary care physician or family doctor will generally play an important role in coordinating treatment with a secondary care clinician if necessary.

The diagnosis is essentially clinical, whereby the clinician undertakes a thorough medical and mental health history and physical examination. Diagnosis should be based on the nature of the presenting symptoms, and is a "rule in" as opposed to "rule out" diagnosis — this means it is based on the presence of positive symptoms and signs that follow a characteristic pattern. There is usually a process of clinical reasoning to reach this point and assessment might require several visits, ideally with the same doctor.

In the clinical setting, there are no laboratory or imaging tests that can consistently be used to diagnose the conditions; however, as is the case with all diagnoses, often additional diagnostic tests (such as blood tests, or diagnostic imaging) will be undertaken to consider the presence of underlying disease. There are however diagnostic criteria that can be used to help a doctor assess whether an individual is likely to suffer from a particular functional syndrome. These are usually based on the presence or absence of characteristic clinical signs and symptoms. Self-report questionnaires may also be useful.

There has been a tradition of a separate diagnostic classification systems for "somatic" and "mental" disorder classifications. Currently, the 11th version of the International Classification System of Diseases (ICD-11) has specific diagnostic criteria for certain disorders which would be considered by many clinicians to be functional somatic disorders, such as IBS or chronic widespread pain/fibromyalgia, and dissociative neurological symptom disorder.

In the fifth edition of the Diagnostic and Statistical Manual of Mental Disorders (DSM-5) the older term somatoform (DSM-IV) has been replaced by somatic symptom disorder, which is a disorder characterised by persistent somatic (physical) symptoms, and associated psychological problems to the degree that it interferes with daily functioning and causes distress. (APA, 2022). Bodily distress disorder is a related term in the ICD-11.

Somatic symptom disorder and bodily distress disorder have significant overlap with functional disorders and are often assigned if someone would benefit from psychological therapies addressing psychological or behavioural factors which contribute to the persistence of symptoms. However, people with symptoms partly explained by structural disease (for example, cancer) may also meet the criteria for diagnosis of functional disorders, somatic symptom disorder and bodily distress disorder.

It is not unusual for a functional disorder to coexist with another diagnosis (for example, functional seizures can coexist with epilepsy, or irritable bowel syndrome with inflammatory bowel disease. This is important to recognise as additional treatment approaches might be indicated in order that the patient achieves adequate relief from their symptoms.

The diagnostic process is considered an important step in order for treatment to move forward successfully. When healthcare professionals are giving a diagnosis and carrying out treatment, it is important to communicate openly and honestly and not to fall into the trap of dualistic concepts – that is "either mental or physical" thinking; or attempt to "reattribute" symptoms to a predominantly psychosocial cause. It often important to recognise the need to cease unnecessary additional diagnostic testing if a clear diagnosis has been established .

== Causes ==
Explanatory models that support our understanding of functional disorders take into account the multiple factors involved in symptom development. A personalised, tailored approach is usually needed in order to consider the factors which relate to that individual's biomedical, psychological, social, and material environment.

More recent functional neuroimaging studies have suggested malfunctioning of neural circuits involved in stress processing, emotional regulation, self-agency, interoception, and sensorimotor integration. A recent article in Scientific American proposed that important brain structures suspected in the pathophysiology of functional neurological disorder include increased activity of the amygdala and decreased activity within the right temporoparietal junction.

Healthcare professionals might find it useful to consider three main categories of factors: predisposing, precipitating, and perpetuating (maintaining) factors.

=== Predisposing factors ===
These are factors that make the person more vulnerable to the onset of a functional disorder; and include biological, psychological and social factors. Like all health conditions, some people are probably predisposed to develop functional disorders due to their genetic make-up. However, no single genes have been identified that are associated with functional disorders. Epigenetic mechanisms (mechanisms that affect interaction of genes with their environment) are likely to be important, and have been studied in relation to the hypothalamic–pituitary–adrenal axis. Other predisposing factors include current or prior somatic/physical illness or injury, and endocrine, immunological or microbial factors.

Functional disorders are diagnosed more frequently in female patients. Medical bias possibly contributes to the sex differences in diagnosis: women are more likely to be diagnosed than men with a functional disorder by doctors.

People with functional disorders also have higher rates of pre-existing mental and physical health conditions, including depression and anxiety disorders, Post-traumatic stress disorder, multiple sclerosis and epilepsy. Personality style has been suggested as a risk factor in the development of functional disorders but the effect of any individual personality trait is variable and weak. Alexithymia has been widely studied in patients with functional disorders and is sometimes addressed as part of treatment. Migration, cultural and family understanding of illness, are also factors that influence the chance of an individual developing a functional disorder. Being exposed to illness in the family while growing up or having parents who are healthcare professionals are sometimes considered risk factors. Adverse childhood experiences and traumatic experiences of all kinds are known important risk factors. Newer hypotheses have suggested minority stressors may play a role in the development of functional disorders in marginalized communities.

=== Precipitating factors ===
These are the factors that for some patients appear to trigger the onset of a functional disorder. Typically, these involve either an acute cause of physical or emotional stress, for example an operation, a viral illness, a car accident, a sudden bereavement, or a period of intense and prolonged overload of chronic stressors (for example relationship difficulties, job or financial stress, or caring responsibilities). Not all affected individuals will be able to identify obvious precipitating factors and some functional disorders develop gradually over time.

=== Perpetuating factors ===
These are the factors that contribute to the development of functional disorder as a persistent condition and maintaining symptoms. These can include the condition of the physiological systems including the immune and neuroimmune systems, the endocrine system, the musculoskeletal system, the sleep-wake cycle, the brain and nervous system, the person's thoughts and experience, their experience of the body, social situation and environment. All these layers interact with each other. Illness mechanisms are important therapeutically as they are seen as potential targets of treatment.

The exact illness mechanisms that are responsible for maintaining an individual's functional disorder should be considered on an individual basis. However, various models have been suggested to account for how symptoms develop and continue. For some people there seems to be a process of central-sensitisation, chronic low grade inflammation or altered stress reactivity mediated through the hypothalamic-pituitary-adrenal (HPA) axis (Fischer et al., 2022). For some people attentional mechanisms are likely to be important. Commonly, illness-perceptions or behaviours and expectations (Henningsen, Van den Bergh et al. 2018 ) contribute to maintaining an impaired physiological condition.

Perpetuating illness mechanisms are often conceptualized as "vicious cycles", which highlights the non-linear patterns of causality characteristic of these disorders. Other people adopt a pattern of trying to achieve a lot on "good days" which results in exhaustion for days following and a flare up of symptoms, which has led to various energy management tools being used in the patient community, such as "Spoon Theory."

Depression, PTSD, sleep disorders, and anxiety disorders can also perpetuate functional disorders and should be identified and treated where they are present. Side effects or withdrawal effects of medication often need to be considered. Iatrogenic factors such as lack of a clear diagnosis, not feeling believed or not taken seriously by a healthcare professional, multiple (invasive) diagnostic procedures, ineffective treatments and not getting an explanation for symptoms can increase worry and unhelpful illness behaviours. Stigmatising medical attitudes and unnecessary medical interventions (tests, surgeries or drugs) can also cause harm and worsen symptoms.

== Treatment ==
Functional disorders can be treated successfully and are considered reversible conditions. Treatment strategies should integrate biological, psychological and social perspectives. The body of research around evidence-based treatment in functional disorders is growing.

With regard to self-management, there are many basic things that can be done to optimise recovery. Learning about and understanding the condition is helpful in itself. Many people are able to use bodily complaints as a signal to slow down and reassess their balance between exertion and recovery. Bodily complaints can be used as a signal to begin incorporating stress reduction and balanced lifestyle measures (routine, regular activity and relaxation, diet, social engagement) that can help reduce symptoms and are central to improving quality of life. Mindfulness practice can be helpful for some people. Family members or friends can also be helpful in supporting recovery.

Most affected people benefit from support and encouragement in this process, ideally through a multi-disciplinary team with expertise in treating functional disorders. Family members or friends may also be helpful in supporting recovery. The aim of treatment overall is to first create the conditions necessary for recovery, and then plan a programme of rehabilitation to re-train mind-body connections making use of the body's ability to change. Particular strategies can be taught to manage bowel symptoms, pain or seizures. Though medication alone should not be considered curative in functional disorders, medication to reduce symptoms might be indicated in some instances, for example where mood or pain is a significant issue, preventing adequate engagement in rehabilitation. It is important to address accompanying factors such as sleep disorders, pain, depression and anxiety, and concentration difficulties.

Physiotherapy may be relevant for exercise and activation programs, or when weakness or pain is a problem. Psychotherapy might be helpful to explore a pattern of thoughts, actions and behaviours that could be driving a negative cycle – for example tackling illness expectations or preoccupations about symptoms. Some existing evidence-based treatments include cognitive behavioural therapy (CBT) for functional neurological disorder; physiotherapy for functional motor symptoms, and dietary modification or gut targeting agents for irritable bowel syndrome.

== Controversies and stigma ==
Despite some progress in the last decade, people with functional disorders continue to suffer subtle and overt forms of discrimination by clinicians, researchers and the public. Stigma is a common experience for individuals who present with functional symptoms and is often driven by historical narratives and factual inaccuracies. Given that functional disorders do not usually have specific biomarkers or findings on structural imaging that are typically undertaken in routine clinical practice, this leads to potential for symptoms to be misunderstood, invalidated, or dismissed, leading to adverse experiences when individuals are seeking help.

Part of this stigma is also driven by theories around "mind body dualism", which frequently surfaces as an area of importance for patients, researchers and clinicians in the realm of functional disorders. Artificial separation of the mind/brain/body (for example the use of phrases such as; "physical versus psychological" or "organic versus non-organic") furthers misunderstanding and misconceptions around these disorders, and only serves to hinder progress in scientific domain and for patients seeking treatment. Some patient groups have fought to have their illnesses not classified as functional disorders, because in some insurance based health-care systems these have attracted lower insurance payments. Current research is moving away from dualistic theories, and recognising the importance of the whole person, both mind and body, in diagnosis and treatment of these conditions.

People with functional disorders frequently describe experiences of doubt, blame, and of being seen as less 'genuine' than those with other disorders. Some clinicians perceive those individuals with functional disorders are imagining their symptoms, are malingering, or doubt the level of voluntary control they have over their symptoms. As a result, individuals with these disorders often wait long periods of time to be seen by specialists and receive appropriate treatment. Currently, there is a lack of specialised treatment services for functional disorders in many countries. However, research is growing in this area, and it is hoped that the implementation of the increased scientific understanding of functional disorders and their treatment will allow effective clinical services supporting individuals with functional disorders to develop. Patient membership organisations/advocate groups have been instrumental in gaining recognition for individuals with these disorders.

== Research ==
Directions for research involve understanding more about the processes underlying functional disorders, identifying what leads to symptom persistence and improving integrated care/treatment pathways for patients.

Research into the biological mechanisms which underpin functional disorders is ongoing. Understanding how stress effects the body over a lifetime, for example via the immune endocrine and autonomic nervous systems, is important Ying-Chih et al. 2020, Tak et al. 2011, Nater et al. 2011). Subtle dysfunctions of these systems, for example through low grade chronic inflammation, or dysfunctional breathing patterns, are increasingly thought to underlie functional disorders and their treatment. However, more research is needed before these theoretical mechanisms can be used clinically to guide treatment for an individual patient.

== See also ==
- Idiopathic disease
- Functional gastrointestinal disorder
- Functional neurological symptom disorder
- Functional symptom
- Psychosomatic medicine
