= Clinical Pharmacology & Therapeutics =

- Discipline: Pharmacology
- Language: English
- Edited by: Piet van der Graaf

Publication details
- History: 1960-present
- Publisher: Wiley-Blackwell
- Frequency: Monthly
- Open access: Hybrid
- Impact factor: 6.3 (2023)

Standard abbreviations
- ISO 4: Clin. Pharmacol. Ther.

Indexing
- CODEN: CLPTAT
- ISSN: 0009-9236 (print); 1532-6535 (web)
- LCCN: 61066293
- OCLC no.: 1554939

Links
- Journal homepage; Online archive

Clinical Pharmacology & Therapeutics is a monthly peer-reviewed medical journal which covers research on the nature, action, efficacy, and evaluation of therapeutics. The editor-in-chief is Piet van der Graaf (Cetara). The journal was established in 1960 and is published by Wiley-Blackwell. It is an official journal of the American Society for Clinical Pharmacology & Therapeutics.

== Abstracting and indexing ==
The journal is abstracted and indexed in:

- Chemical Abstracts Service
- Current Contents/Clinical Medicine
- Current Contents/Life Sciences
- BIOSIS Previews
- EBSCO databases
- Index Medicus/MEDLINE/PubMed
- Science Citation Index
- Scopus

According to the Journal Citation Reports, the journal has a 2020 impact factor of 6.875, ranking it 19th out of 275 journals in the category "Pharmacology & Pharmacy".
