= Psychogenic non-epileptic seizure =

Type of neurological disorder

- Other names: Functional seizures, dissociative seizures, non-epileptic attack disorder (NEAD), non-epileptic seizures (NES), functional non-epileptic attacks (FNEA), pseudoseizures (outdated)
- Specialty: Neurology, psychiatry
- Symptoms: Seizure-like episodes without EEG evidence of epilepsy; may include unresponsiveness, shaking, or altered awareness
- Complications: Misdiagnosis as epilepsy, impaired quality of life, economic losses, isolation
- Usual onset: Any age, but most common in early adulthood
- Duration: Variable; can persist without treatment; some cases may remit with treatment or spontaneously
- Diagnostic method: Clinical evaluation, video-EEG monitoring
- Differential diagnosis: Epileptic seizures, syncope, panic attacks, movement disorders, migraine, hypoglycemia
- Treatment: Patient education, psychotherapy (especially cognitive behavioral therapy), treatment of comorbid conditions

Psychogenic non-epileptic seizures (PNES), also referred to as functional seizures or dissociative seizures, are paroxysmal episodes of impaired or altered consciousness, abnormal movements, and/or sensory symptoms. They may superficially resemble epileptic seizures but are not caused by abnormal electrical activity in the brain. Instead, they are classified as a type of functional neurological disorder (FND), in which symptoms may arise from changes in brain function rather than structural disease or hypersynchronous neural activity as seen in epilepsy. During a PNES episode, seizure-like behavior occurs in the absence of epileptiform activity on electroencephalogram (EEG). PNES has previously been referred to as pseudoseizures, although this terminology has fallen out of favor due to associated stigma.

PNES can be difficult to distinguish from epileptic seizures based on clinical observation alone. Diagnosis is typically confirmed through video-EEG monitoring, which records both the clinical event and the absence of epileptiform activity. These episodes are involuntary and genuine, not consciously produced. Management primarily involves psychological treatment, particularly cognitive behavioral therapy (CBT). Outcomes vary and may be influenced by factors such as early diagnosis, therapeutic engagement, and coexisting psychiatric conditions.

== Signs and symptoms ==
PNES episodes involve sudden changes in movement, sensation, or awareness that closely resemble epileptic seizures. During an episode, a person may exhibit convulsive movements (such as stiffening, jerking, or thrashing of the limbs), appear unresponsive, or display other seizure-like behaviors. Because of this resemblance, PNES can be difficult to distinguish from epilepsy without careful observation and diagnostic tools, such as long-term video EEG monitoring.

Certain features are more commonly seen in PNES than in epileptic seizures, although none are exclusive. These may include eye closure or fluttering during the event, side-to-side movements of the head or body, pelvic thrusting, arching of the back, limb movements that are asynchronous or irregular, and crying or stuttering. People with PNES may also show signs of awareness, respond to touch or voice, or behave in ways that appear influenced by their surroundings. PNES episodes also tend to begin more gradually than epileptic seizures, and typically do not result in confusion or deep sleep afterward (postictal state), which is common following epileptic seizures. The shaking seen in PNES tends to be less likely to be rhythmic or synchronous such as in epileptic seizures. Also, PNES episodes tend to be longer in duration compared to epileptic seizures. Most epileptic seizures are less than 2 minutes in duration whereas PNES episodes can last much longer and in some cases may go on for hours. A seizure lasting more than five minutes is considered a life-threatening medical emergency, a risk not associated with PNES.

PNES episodes also tend to result in fewer physical injuries. Complications such as tongue-biting, loss of bladder or bowel control, injuries from falls, or burns are much less common. Even when a person appears unresponsive, they may retain some awareness and instinctively protect themselves. Signs such as tracking movement with the eyes or resisting gentle attempts to open the eyelids can suggest preserved consciousness. These features may support the diagnosis of PNES, although no single sign is definitive. Patients with PNES are generally recommended to abstain from driving since an episode while operating a vehicle may result in a crash or injury. Laws with respect to driving may differ in different jurisdictions.

== Comorbidities ==
Mental Health Conditions

Psychiatric disorders are prevalent in patients with PNES. In particular, patients are more likely to have a history of post-traumatic stress disorder (PTSD), anxiety disorders, mood disorders, and/or personality disorders. For instance, one of the predominant personality disorders observed in patients with PNES is borderline personality disorder or its traits. There are several overlapping characteristics between the PNES and borderline personality disorder, including a history of childhood trauma, emotional dysregulation, and challenges with interpersonal relationships. Other personality disorders that have also been reported include avoidant, dependent, or obsessive-compulsive types.

Chronic Pain

Patients with PNES are more likely to experience chronic pain than patients with epilepsy, with a gender predisposition towards women. Persistent pain can be disabling and stressful, which may reinforce harmful coping strategies and exacerbate PNES. There is some speculation that opioid system could be involved in the pathophysiology of PNES and dissociation. The body's internal (or endogenous) opioid system plays a role in its response to chronic stress or trauma by increasing release of opioids. Additionally, up to one third of patients with PNES take opioid pain medication.

Traumatic Brain Injury (TBI)

A history of traumatic brain injury (TBI, typically mild) ranging from 16-83% has been reported in patients with PNES. TBI can have prolonged neuropsychiatric sequalae, mediated by the patients' personal experience of their injury which is usually in a stressful setting, which can create and potentiate harmful stress responses. Subtle changes in brain structure from mild TBI which may not be visible on imaging, such as diffuse axonal injury, may disrupt multiple connecting networks in the brain (global connectivity). These factors are thought to play a role in dissociation and therefore may contribute to the development of PNES.

Other Comorbidities

Individuals with PNES have been shown to have an elevated prevalence of other conditions including fibromyalgia, chronic fatigue syndrome, migraine, asthma, or irritable bowel syndrome. Other reported complaints include sleep problems (e.g., sleep-disordered breathing, periodic limb movement disorder, and lower sleep quality) and cognitive challenges (e.g., forgetfulness and concentration difficulties). Patients often have higher use of medications for pain (including opioids), high blood pressure, respiratory symptoms, sleep, and acid reflux.

== Causes ==
The causes of PNES are not well understood, and are complex and not linked to a single underlying mechanism. A biopsychosocial framework has been proposed to understand the condition, which considers the interaction of psychological, neurobiological, and social factors. These influences are often described in terms of predisposing, precipitating, and perpetuating factors.

Predisposing factors may include early adversity, difficulties with emotional processing or regulation, and certain psychological traits. These traits do not directly cause PNES but may increase vulnerability when combined with biological and environmental influences. Precipitating factors are events that occur near the time of symptom onset, such as acute psychological stress, interpersonal conflict, or stress related to physical illness or injury. Perpetuating factors are those that contribute to the continuation of symptoms after they begin. These may include initial misdiagnosis as epilepsy, repeated medical investigations that inadvertently reinforce illness-focused behavior, and avoidance of situations associated with distress or fear. Ongoing mental health difficulties can also play a role, while disruptions to social, educational, or occupational functioning may further hinder recovery.

Psychiatric comorbidities are common, particularly post-traumatic stress disorder (PTSD). According to a 2006 review, while there is evidence suggesting a link between child sexual abuse and PNES, limitations in research design make it "premature to draw any definitive conclusions regarding a relationship".

Additional common comorbidities include mood disorders, anxiety disorders, personality disorders, and other manifestations of functional neurological disorder. For example, over half of patients with PNES have been found to have other functional symptoms. These include functional movement disorders and functional limb weakness. PNES in conjunction with other functional symptoms are positively correlated with higher severity of episodes (non-epileptic) and poor outcome.

According to a 2016 review, there is insufficient evidence to conclude that PNES has a psychogenic cause, as existing evidence fails to establish causality, and suffers from limitations such as a reliance on retrospective self-reports and clinical features not unique to psychogenic conditions.

PNES episodes are not consciously produced and are not under voluntary control. They are distinct from conditions such as malingering or factitious disorder, in which symptoms are intentionally fabricated or induced.

An estimated 10% to 30% of individuals with PNES also have coexisting epilepsy, which can complicate both diagnosis and treatment.

== Diagnosis ==
PNES are often difficult to distinguish from epileptic seizures based on clinical observation alone. The gold standard for diagnosis is video-EEG monitoring, which records both the clinical event and corresponding brain activity. In PNES, seizure-like behavior occurs in the absence of epileptiform activity on the EEG. While routine EEGs may be performed during initial evaluation, they are often normal or inconclusive in individuals with PNES and cannot confirm the diagnosis. Certain clinical features may raise suspicion of PNES, but none are definitive, and many overlap with epileptic seizures.

In the DSM-5, psychogenic non-epileptic seizures are classified under functional neurological symptom disorder (conversion disorder). The diagnosis is based on the presence of neurological symptoms that are incompatible with known neurological conditions and not better explained by another disorder, and cause significant distress or impairment.

=== Neuroimaging ===
Imaging studies of patients with PNES typically do not reveal any structural disease process that explains their symptoms. While not required to make a diagnosis, brain imaging studies such as computed tomography (CT) and magnetic resonance imaging (MRI) are often ordered. Because PNES is considered a disorder a brain function, there has been a growing body of research to investigate functional brain changes in these patients. According to a 2024 literature review of patients with PNES who underwent brain imaging, three neuroanatomical locations were recurrently found to have functional (rather than structural) abnormalities as detailed in the table below. More research needs to be completed to further evaluate the pathophysiology of PNES.

Structure	Function
Amygdala	Learning and emotional balance
Orbitofrontal cortex	Executive function and emotional regulation
Anterior cingulate cortex	Decision making, emotional regulation, visuospatial orientation

=== Differential diagnosis ===
The primary step in differential diagnosis is to exclude epilepsy, along with other organic causes of non-epileptic seizures, including syncope, migraine, vertigo, anoxia, hypoglycemia, and stroke. However, 10–30% of people with PNES also have comorbid epilepsy. Frontal lobe seizures can be mistaken for PNES, though these tend to have shorter duration, stereotyped patterns of movements, and occurrence during sleep.

Psychiatric conditions may also resemble PNES. Panic attacks, dissociative episodes, and other functional neurological symptoms can involve unresponsiveness, shaking, or altered awareness that mimic seizures. PNES may co-occur with disorders such as post-traumatic stress disorder (PTSD) or functional movement disorders, and diagnostic clarity often requires careful assessment of context, semiology, and psychiatric history.

Factitious disorder and malingering may be considered in rare cases where there is evidence of intentional symptom production. These are distinct entities with different motivations; in the vast majority of cases, PNES occur involuntarily and without conscious intent.

== Complications ==
Patients with PNES have a lower quality of life on average than patients with epilepsy. Contributing factors include somatic symptoms, psychiatric comorbidities and cognitive complaints. Cognitive symptoms are commonly reported in patients with PNES and are thought to be multifactorial in etiology. Patients with PNES tend to have an elevated prevalence of conditions such as chronic pain, psychiatric conditions, and impaired sleep. It has been speculated that attentional resources may be overwhelmed by these factors and make it more difficult to properly attend to external tasks.

Stigma and social isolation are common in patients with PNES. Patients with PNES often lose the ability to work and in most jurisdictions are not able to drive. This can be exacerbated by a delay in diagnosis or misdiagnosis which is common for PNES. Healthcare providers have been found to have negative biases towards patients with PNES which can further exacerbate these problems. Patients with PNES have been found to be more likely on government assistance and to earn less after onset of the condition.

Multiple studies around the world have found that patients with PNES have an elevated mortality rate. Mortality rates were particularly elevated in younger patients and among those with coexisting substance use disorders. The cause of elevated mortality is not completely understood but seems to be more related to comorbidities associated with PNES than the condition itself.

== Treatment ==
There is no single treatment for psychogenic non-epileptic seizures (PNES). Instead, management focuses on a multidisciplinary approach that includes patient education, psychotherapy, and treatment of comorbid psychiatric conditions. Early diagnosis and appropriate communication of the diagnosis are important, as delayed recognition and misdiagnosis with epilepsy are associated with worse outcomes. According to a 2003 review, one study showed that diagnosis, explanation of the condition, and initiation of psychological treatment led to a large reduction in healthcare service utilization, such as emergency room visits and diagnostic tests.

Cognitive Behavioral Therapy (CBT)

Cognitive behavioral therapy (CBT) is an evidence-based form of psychotherapy indicated for a multitude of psychological disorders, such as anxiety disorders, depression and post-traumatic stress disorder (PTSD). It entails helping patients recognize and correct harmful beliefs and behaviors, in addition to teaching them various strategies to mitigate their symptoms. Treatment duration is variable, however some authors focus on a 12-session model. CBT has traditionally been used to treat PNES, with recent evidence supporting it's efficacy. A 2024 systematic review and meta-analysis identified three randomized control trials involving 450 patients that compared CBT and standardized medical treatment versus standardized medical treatment alone for adults with functional seizures. The authors found that receiving CBT was significantly associated with a higher likelihood of seizure freedom, decreased anxiety and improved quality of life. This study overall demonstrated that CBT is an effective treatment for PNES and has potential to positively impact many other aspects of patients' health and well-being.

Interpersonal Therapy

This approach assumes that the patient's challenges are secondary to or worsened by disruptions in their major personal relationships, with the patient's symptoms reflecting underlying dysfunctional patterns. One of the goals is to identify and modify dysfunctional patterns while developing ways to effectively process any current or prior distressing emotions. Treatment can consist of an initial interview followed by weekly or bimonthly sessions.

Mindfulness

Mindfulness-based therapies focus on self-regulation and welcoming one's experience with a sense of curiosity. Sessions may focus on stress management, incorporating mindfulness into everyday life, and emotional regulation.

Psychoeducation

This therapy is centered on further educating the patient about the condition, which may include information on comorbidities, the impact of past stressors including trauma, or techniques to strengthen the mind-body relationship. The frequency of sessions is variable, ranging from weekly to monthly meetings, often in a group format.

Medications

Misdiagnosis of PNES as epileptic seizures can lead to inappropriate and excessive use of anti-seizure medications, which are not indicated for the treatment of PNES and can negatively affect patients' perspectives about their condition. Once an accurate diagnosis of PNES is made and epilepsy is ruled out, any previously prescribed anti-seizure medications should be discontinued under the supervision of a medical professional. Exceptions include if these medications were used for other purposes such as migraine or if the patient has coexisting epilepsy. Educating patients about the reasoning behind removing such medications and physically discontinuing them can positively impact quality of life and long-term outcome.

There is no medication specifically indicated for the treatment of PNES. However, psychiatric medications such as antidepressants or anxiolytics may be prescribed to treat comorbid conditions. There is no evidence that PNES can specifically be treated with medications.

== Prognosis ==
According to a 2013 review, most studies indicate that seizures persist long-term in over two thirds of people with PNES. This was reflected in a more recent 2023 study that followed patients with PNES for 2-15 years, which reported about one-third of patients becoming seizure-free. Early diagnosis and absence of severe comorbid psychiatric or personality disorders may predict a better prognosis. According to the 2013 review, acceptance of the diagnosis and willingness to engage in therapy may have an effect on outcomes, however "this has not been studied as a formal outcome or moderator in controlled treatment trials."

Recent studies demonstrate a favorable prognosis of patients with PNES. For example, patients who receive cognitive behavioral therapy are more likely to achieve seizure-freedom than those who do not receive it. While mitigating the frequency of seizures is a goal of treatment, there are non-seizure related aspects of patients' health that can also improve with therapy. A 2023 meta-analytic review found a positive effect when evaluating the impact of psychological treatment on non-seizure outcomes for patients, demonstrating that treatment was associated with significant improvements in multiple domains such mental health (including anxiety and depression), quality of life, and functioning (including social and occupational settings).

Due to lack of access to specialists and treatment, not all patients with PNES, especially those in resource-limited communities and/or countries, are able to obtain treatment. Despite that, select studies have shown that patients with PNES who do not receive treatment can achieve seizure-freedom. One study in 2019 followed all patients with PNES for at least 5 years who were admitted and diagnosed in an epilepsy monitoring unit in Iran; these patients never followed up with a psychologist or received psychological therapy. The authors found that just over half of the patients were seizure-free in the preceding 12 months upon follow-up. The duration of symptoms before receiving an accurate diagnosis was associated with better outcomes (such that patients who were seizure-free had a relatively shorter duration of illness before being provided a diagnosis). This suggests that early and accurate diagnosis of PNES during a patient's clinical course may enhance the likelihood of achieving seizure-freedom over time.

== Epidemiology ==
PNES has been reported around the world but accurate epidemiological data is limited due to the fact that this condition is frequently misdiagnosed and underdiagnosed. Available estimates suggest that PNES is an uncommon diagnosis in community settings but is frequently encountered in specialized epilepsy care. A 2021 systematic review calculated the annual incidence at approximately 3.1 per 100,000, based on population-based studies from Iceland, Scotland, and the United States. Using modeling based on incidence and outcome data, the same study estimated a point prevalence of 108.5 per 100,000 in the United States in 2019. Available estimates suggest that PNES constitutes 2% of new referrals to general neurology clinics and 11% of cases in emergency centers in community settings. Among adults referred to epilepsy monitoring units (EMUs) for refractory seizures, 20–40% are diagnosed with PNES, while outpatient epilepsy clinics report rates of 5–10%.

The condition is more frequently diagnosed in women, with female-to-male ratios reported between 2.7 and 4.4. According to a 2019 review article, 60-80% of PNES patients were females with the average age of onset around 28 years. Additionally, it was more often diagnosed in patients from lower socioeconomic backgrounds (which is also observed in epilepsy). Estimates are influenced by diagnostic delays, differences in healthcare access, and limited availability of population-based studies.

=== Children ===
Data on the epidemiology of PNES in children are limited, and most studies are based on selected populations undergoing video-EEG monitoring. Reported prevalence in pediatric video-EEG units ranges widely, from 3.5% to 20%. Community-based prevalence estimates are sparse, but some sources have cited figures between 2 and 33 per 100,000, though these are largely extrapolated from adult data. PNES are rare before the age of eight and become more common during adolescence. The average age at presentation is typically between 11 and 14 years, with most studies reporting a higher prevalence among girls, although some have found a more equal gender distribution in younger children.

Economic Cost

While functional neurological disorder (including PNES) negatively impacts patients on an individual level, systemically it has repercussions on health care systems and the economy at large. It negatively affects patients' quality of life and carries both direct and indirect costs, such as those from diagnostic investigations and salary loss from absences during employment, respectively. The costs of functional neurological disorder are similar to other chronic neurologic conditions. The average annual cost per patient with PNES ranges from almost $5,000 to over $80,000. The cost of the illness in some countries have been estimated to surpass one billion dollars per year. Fortunately, it has also been found that interventions such as clearly delivering the diagnosis of PNES or undergoing psychotherapy significantly reduced healthcare costs and improved quality of life.

== History ==
The phenomenon of psychogenic seizures has been recognized (in various forms) for centuries. The earliest documentations are in the medical texts of ancient Egyptian and Greek civilizations in which the term hysteria was first coined. "Hysteria" is derived from the Greek word for womb, which historically was considered the organ causing functional symptoms in women. There was a belief that the womb (uterus) became "frustrated" and travelled to other locations in the body, causing such symptoms. Ancient Greek and Roman physicians, including Aretaeus of Cappadocia, described conditions they linked to reproductive dysfunction and psychological factors. Over the next millennium, the concept of hysteria permeated into other aspects of cultures outside of medicine; it became closely intertwined with witchcraft in the 15^{th} century and was reflected in Italian Renaissance paintings in the 16^{th} century (such as The healing of the possessed woman by Andrea del Sarto). It was considered a disease exclusive to women until the 17^{th} century when English physicians Thomas Willis and Thomas Syndeham reported cases of hysteria in men. This led to a crucial shift in belief as what was initially considered the cause of disease, the uterus, was replaced by the brain, allowing one to view hysteria as a neurologic disorder. In the 19th century, Jean-Martin Charcot provided the first systematic medical descriptions of these episodes, coining the term hystero-epilepsy to distinguish them from epileptic seizures.

The psychoanalytic framework of the late 19th and early 20th centuries, particularly through the work of Austrian physician Sigmund Freud and French physician Pierre Janet (students of Charcot), reframed hysteria as a manifestation of unconscious psychological conflict. In this context, it was proposed that repressed traumatic experiences could be "converted" into physical symptoms, such as convulsions or loss of consciousness. Janet similarly discussed this in his research, reporting his own theory on dissociation while discussing the subconscious, bridging a connection between one's past traumatic experiences and current symptoms. Freud's conversion theory became the dominant explanation for such episodes throughout much of the 20th century and shaped early diagnostic categories of conversion disorder. The DSM-IV lists conversion disorders instead of the current FND. Additionally, in revision, the DSM-5 was updated to add emphasis to the positive physical signs inconsistent with recognized diseases. The requirement of a history of psychological stressors and that the symptom is not factious was removed as well.

== Society and culture ==
PNES challenges conventional boundaries between mental and physical illness, in part because their symptoms are real and disabling, but do not originate from epileptic brain activity. Historically, the condition has been associated with significant stigma, both social and clinical. Cultural and contextual factors also influence how PNES are perceived. In some societies, seizure-like episodes are understood through religious or spiritual frameworks, such as demonic possession, curses, or witchcraft. These interpretations can shape how individuals experience and explain their symptoms, as well as the kind of care they seek. In highly medicalized settings, the absence of objective findings on EEG or neuroimaging may lead to moral judgments, including assumptions of attention-seeking or malingering. These beliefs can contribute to internalized stigma, reduced help-seeking, and poorer health outcomes. Culture-specific understandings of illness, along with structural factors such as access to interdisciplinary care, can shape both the experience of PNES and the social responses it provokes. Stigmatizing language — such as 'pseudo,' 'false,' or 'hysterical' — has contributed to perceptions that PNES is feigned or under voluntary control.

== Terminology ==
The terminology used to describe PNES has evolved, reflecting changes in medical understanding as well as shifting attitudes toward functional disorders. Historically, the term pseudoseizure was widely used, but it has fallen out of favor due to its stigmatizing connotations. The prefix pseudo- implies falseness or deception, and its use has been associated with patient-blaming and the perception that symptoms are faked or not legitimate. Major professional bodies, including the International League Against Epilepsy (ILAE), now discourage the term in both clinical and research settings.

The current standard term, psychogenic non-epileptic seizures, has become widely used in clinical and research contexts. However, it has also drawn criticism. The label "psychogenic" implies a purely psychological origin, potentially reinforcing a dualistic distinction between mind and brain that is increasingly challenged by neuroscientific research. It also suggests that identifiable psychological causes, such as trauma or stress, are always present — an assumption not borne out in all cases. Furthermore, the term nonepileptic defines the condition by what it is not, offering little positive information to patients and sometimes hindering acceptance of the diagnosis. Alternative terms, including functional seizures and dissociative seizures, are increasingly used in clinical practice.

Debate also surrounds the appropriate root term: seizure, attack, or event. While some clinicians favor broader terms like non-epileptic events to avoid confusion with epilepsy, the term seizure better captures the paroxysmal and stereotyped semiology of the episodes. It also allows PNES to be classified consistently with other seizure types, such as febrile or hypoglycemic seizures, which are not epileptic but are still medically recognized. Importantly, studies suggest that many patients prefer the term seizure to alternatives such as attack or fit, and clinicians are encouraged to provide careful explanations to minimize confusion.

Recently, the ILAE has suggested that the term functional/dissociative seizures is used.
