= Uroguanylin =

guanylate cyclase activator 2B (uroguanylin)

Identifiers
- Symbol: GUCA2B
- NCBI gene: 2981
- HGNC: 4683
- OMIM: 601271
- RefSeq: NM_007102
- UniProt: Q16661

Other data
- Locus: Chr. 1 p34-p33
Search for
- Structures: Swiss-model
- Domains: InterPro

Uroguanylin
- Stereo, skeletal formula of uroguanylin

Identifiers
CAS Number	152175-68-3
3D model (JSmol)	Interactive image
ChemSpider	4589972
MeSH	uroguanylin
PubChem CID	5488765
UNII	EWY1XP1HMZ
CompTox Dashboard (EPA)	DTXSID10164965
- InChI: InChI=1S/C64H102N18O26S4/c1-24(2)13-32-53(96)79-40-23-112-109-20-37(57(100)76-36(64(107)108)14-25(3)4)70-43(86)19-68-61(104)49(29(10)83)82-60(103)39(77-50(93)28(9)69-62(105)47(26(5)6)80-56(99)33(16-42(67)85)75-63(106)48(27(7)8)81-59(40)102)22-111-110-21-38(58(101)71-31(52(95)73-32)11-12-44(87)88)78-55(98)35(18-46(91)92)74-54(97)34(17-45(89)90)72-51(94)30(65)15-41(66)84/h24-40,47-49,83H,11-23,65H2,1-10H3,(H2,66,84)(H2,67,85)(H,68,104)(H,69,105)(H,70,86)(H,71,101)(H,72,94)(H,73,95)(H,74,97)(H,75,106)(H,76,100)(H,77,93)(H,78,98)(H,79,96)(H,80,99)(H,81,102)(H,82,103)(H,87,88)(H,89,90)(H,91,92)(H,107,108)/t28-,29+,30-,31-,32-,33-,34-,35-,36-,37-,38-,39-,40-,47-,48-,49-/m0/s1 Key: VQZRYOAXGUCZMI-HWMZBCIHSA-N
- SMILES: C[C@H]1C(=O)N[C@H]2CSSC[C@@H](C(=O)N[C@H](C(=O)N[C@H](C(=O)N[C@@H](CSSC[C@H](NC(=O)CNC(=O)[C@@H](NC2=O)[C@@H](C)O)C(=O)N[C@@H](CC(C)C)C(=O)O)C(=O)N[C@H](C(=O)N[C@H](C(=O)N[C@H](C(=O)N1)C(C)C)CC(=O)N)C(C)C)CC(C)C)CCC(=O)O)NC(=O)[C@H](CC(=O)O)NC(=O)[C@H](CC(=O)O)NC(=O)[C@H](CC(=O)N)N

Properties
Chemical formula	C_{61}H_{101}N_{17}O_{25}S_{4}
Molar mass	1600.81 g·mol^{−1}

Related compounds
Related compounds	PMDTA
- Except where otherwise noted, data are given for materials in their standard state (at 25 °C [77 °F], 100 kPa). Infobox references

Uroguanylin is a 16 amino acid peptide that is secreted by enterochromaffin cells in the duodenum and proximal small intestine. Guanylin acts as an agonist of the guanylyl cyclase receptor guanylate cyclase 2C (GC-C), and regulates electrolyte and water transport in intestinal and renal epithelia. By agonizing this guanylyl cyclase receptor, uroguanylin and guanylin cause intestinal secretion of chloride and bicarbonate to dramatically increase; this process is helped by the second messenger cGMP. Its sequence is H-Asn-Asp-Asp-Cys(1)-Glu-Leu-Cys(2)-Val-Asn-Val-Ala-Cys(1)-Thr-Gly-Cys(2)-Leu-OH.

In humans, the uroguanylin peptide is encoded by the GUCA2B gene. Uroguanylin may be involved in appetite and perceptions of 'fullness' after eating meals, as suggested by a study into mice.

== See also ==
- Natriuretic peptide
- Plecanatide – a medication structurally related to uroguanylin
