= Guanylate cyclase 2C =

GUCY2C

Identifiers
- Aliases: GUCY2C, DIAR6, GUC2C, MECIL, MUCIL, STAR, guanylate cyclase 2C, GC-C
- External IDs: OMIM: 601330; MGI: 106903; HomoloGene: 3641; GeneCards: GUCY2C; OMA:GUCY2C - orthologs

Gene location (Human)
Chr.	Chromosome 12 (human)
Band	12p12.3	Start	14,612,632 bp
Band	12p12.3	End	14,696,599 bp

Gene location (Mouse)
Chr.	Chromosome 6 (mouse)
Band	6 G1|6 66.67 cM	Start	136,674,282 bp
Band	6 G1|6 66.67 cM	End	136,758,763 bp
RNA expression pattern
Bgee	Human / Mouse (ortholog); Top expressed in: jejunal mucosa; mucosa of sigmoid colon; rectum; duodenum; mucosa of ileum; mucosa of transverse colon; testicle; secondary oocyte; epithelium of colon; appendix / Top expressed in: jejunum; colon; duodenum; ileum; epithelium of small intestine; intestinal villus; Ileal epithelium; lymph node; crypt of lieberkuhn; islet of Langerhans; More reference expression data
BioGPS	n/a
Gene ontology
Molecular function	protein kinase activity; nucleotide binding; GTP binding; protein binding; lyase activity; phosphorus-oxygen lyase activity; ATP binding; toxic substance binding; guanylate cyclase activity; adenylate cyclase activity; peptide receptor activity
Cellular component	integral component of membrane; endoplasmic reticulum membrane; membrane; endoplasmic reticulum; guanylate cyclase complex, soluble; plasma membrane
Biological process	intracellular signal transduction; cyclic nucleotide biosynthetic process; receptor guanylyl cyclase signaling pathway; protein phosphorylation; regulation of cell population proliferation; response to toxic substance; cGMP biosynthetic process; digestion; signal transduction
Sources:Amigo / QuickGO
Orthologs
Species	Human	Mouse
Entrez	2984	14917
Ensembl	ENSG00000070019	ENSMUSG00000042638
UniProt	P25092	Q3UWA6
RefSeq (mRNA)	NM_004963	NM_001127318; NM_145067
RefSeq (protein)	NP_004954	NP_001120790; NP_659504
Location (UCSC)	Chr 12: 14.61 – 14.7 Mb	Chr 6: 136.67 – 136.76 Mb
PubMed search
- Wikidata
View/Edit Human	View/Edit Mouse

Guanylate cyclase 2C, also known as guanylyl cyclase C (GC-C), intestinal guanylate cyclase, guanylate cyclase-C receptor, or the heat-stable enterotoxin receptor (hSTAR) is an enzyme that in humans is encoded by the GUCY2C gene.

Guanylyl cyclase is an enzyme found in the luminal aspect of intestinal epithelium and dopamine neurons in the brain. The receptor has an extracellular ligand-binding domain, a single transmembrane region, a region with sequence similar to that of protein kinases, and a C-terminal guanylate cyclase domain. Tyrosine kinase activity mediates the GC-C signaling pathway within the cell.

== Functions ==
GC-C is a key receptor for heat-stable enterotoxins that are responsible for acute secretory diarrhea. Heat-stable enterotoxins are produced by pathogens such as Escherichia coli. Knockout mice deficient in the GC-C gene do not show secretory diarrhea on infection with E. coli, though they do with cholera toxin. This demonstrates the specificity of the GC-C receptor.

== In medicine ==
Guanylate cyclase 2C is the target of linaclotide and plecanatide, oligopeptide agonists used for the treatment of chronic constipation.
