= Guanylin =

guanylate cyclase activator 2A (guanylin)
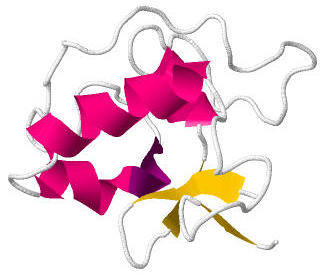
- Solution structure of human proguanylin.

Identifiers
- Symbol: GUCA2A
- Alt. symbols: GUCA2
- NCBI gene: 2980
- HGNC: 4682
- OMIM: 139392
- PDB: 1O8R
- RefSeq: NM_033553
- UniProt: Q02747

Other data
- Locus: Chr. 1 p35-p34
Search for
- Structures: Swiss-model
- Domains: InterPro

Guanylin precursor

Identifiers
- Symbol: Guanylin
- Pfam: PF02058
- InterPro: IPR000879
- SCOP2: 1uyb / SCOPe / SUPFAM
Available protein structures:
- PDB: 1gnb :103-115 1gna :103-115 1o8rA:22-115 1uya :97-111 1uyb :97-111 IPR000879 PF02058 (ECOD; PDBsum)
- AlphaFold: IPR000879; PF02058

Guanylin is a 15 amino acid peptide that is secreted by goblet cells in the colon. Guanylin acts as an agonist of the guanylyl cyclase receptor GC-C and regulates electrolyte and water transport in intestinal and renal epithelia. Upon receptor binding, guanylin increases the intracellular concentration of cGMP, induces chloride secretion and decreases intestinal fluid absorption, ultimately causing diarrhoea. The peptide stimulates the enzyme through the same receptor binding region as the heat-stable enterotoxins.

Researches have found that a loss in guanylin expression can lead to colorectal cancer due to guanylyl cyclase C's function as an intestinal tumor suppressor. When guanylin expression was measured on over 250 colon cancer patients, more than 85% of patients had a loss of guanylin expression in cancerous tissue samples by 100-1000 times when compared to the same patients's nearby healthy colon tissue. Another study done on genetically engineered mice found that mice on a high calorie diet had reduced guanylin expression in the colon. This loss of expression then resulted in guanylyl cyclase C inhibition and the formation of tumors, therefore linking diet-induced obesity with colorectal cancer.

== Human proteins containing this domain ==
GUCA2A; GUCA2B;

== Structure ==
This peptide has two topogies, both isoforms are shown below:

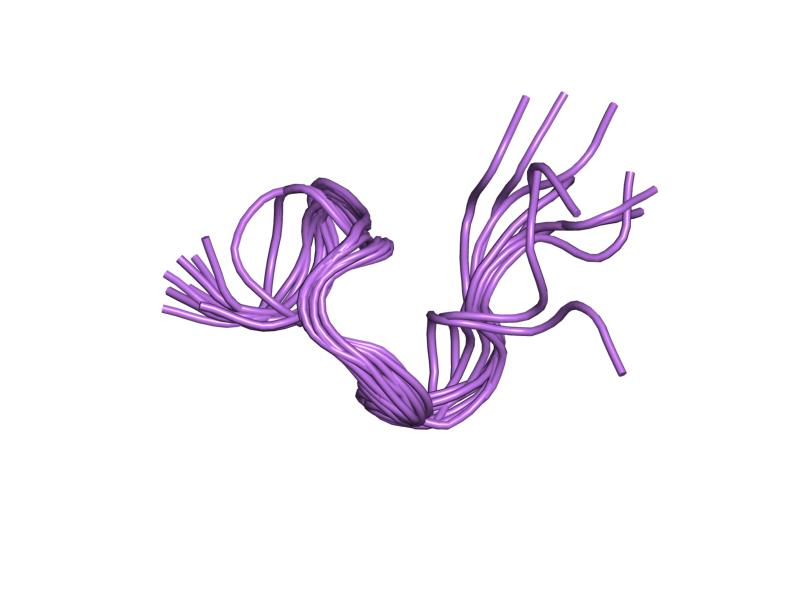
Structure of the A-form of human uroguanylin.

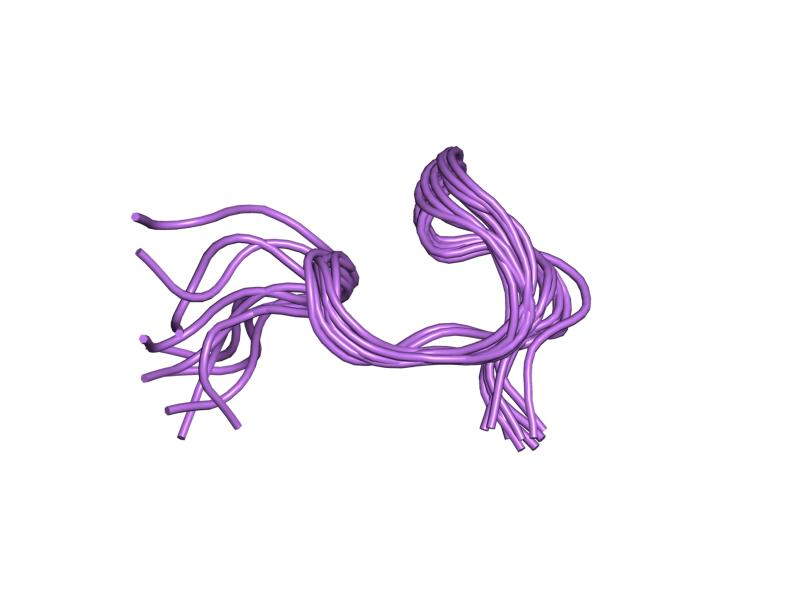
Structure of the B-form of human uroguanylin.
