= Retinitis pigmentosa =

Gradual retinal degeneration leading to progressive sight loss

- Other names: Inherited retinal dystrophy/diseases
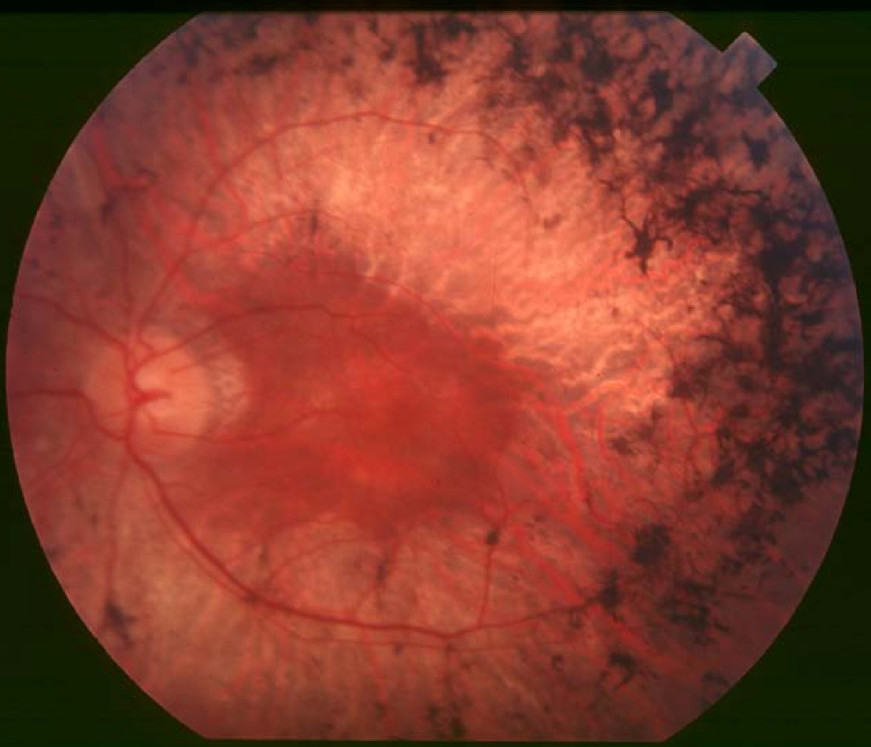
- Back of the eye of a person with mid-stage retinitis pigmentosa. Note pigment deposits in the mid periphery along with retinal atrophy. While the macula is preserved there is some loss of pigmentation around it.
- Specialty: Ophthalmology, Optometry
- Symptoms: Trouble seeing at night, decreased peripheral vision
- Usual onset: Childhood
- Causes: Genetic
- Diagnostic method: Eye examination
- Treatment: Low vision aids, portable lighting, orientation and mobility training
- Frequency: 1 in 4,000 people

Retinitis pigmentosa (RP) is a member of a group of genetic disorders called inherited retinal dystrophy (IRD) that cause loss of vision. Symptoms include trouble seeing at night and decreasing peripheral vision (side and upper or lower visual field). As peripheral vision worsens, people may experience "tunnel vision". Complete blindness is uncommon. Onset of symptoms is generally gradual and often begins in childhood.

Retinitis pigmentosa is generally inherited from one or both parents. It is caused by genetic variants in nearly 100 genes. The underlying mechanism involves the progressive loss of rod photoreceptor cells that line the retina of the eyeball. The rod cells secrete a neuroprotective substance (rod-derived cone viability factor, RdCVF) that protects the cone cells from apoptosis. When these rod cells die, this substance is no longer provided. This is generally followed by the loss of cone photoreceptor cells. Diagnosis is through eye examination of the retina finding dark pigment deposits caused by the rupture of the underlying retinal pigmented epithelial cells, given that these cells contain melanin. Other supportive testing may include the electroretinogram (ERG), visual field testing (VFT), ocular coherence tomography (OCT) and DNA testing to determine the gene responsible for a person's particular type of RP.

There is currently no cure for retinitis pigmentosa. Efforts to manage the problem may include the use of low vision aids, portable lighting, or orientation and mobility training. Vitamin A palmitate supplements may be useful to slow progression. A visual prosthesis may be an option for people with severe symptoms.

There is only one FDA-approved gene therapy that is commercially available to RP patients with Leber congenital amaurosis type 2. It replaces the miscoded RPE65 protein that is produced within the retinal pigmented epithelium. It has been found to be effective in approximately 50% of the patients who receive the therapy. The earlier a child receives the RPE65 therapy, the better their chances are for a positive outcome. There are many other therapies being researched at this time, with the goal of being approved in the next few years.

It is estimated to affect 1 in 4,000 people.

== Signs and symptoms ==
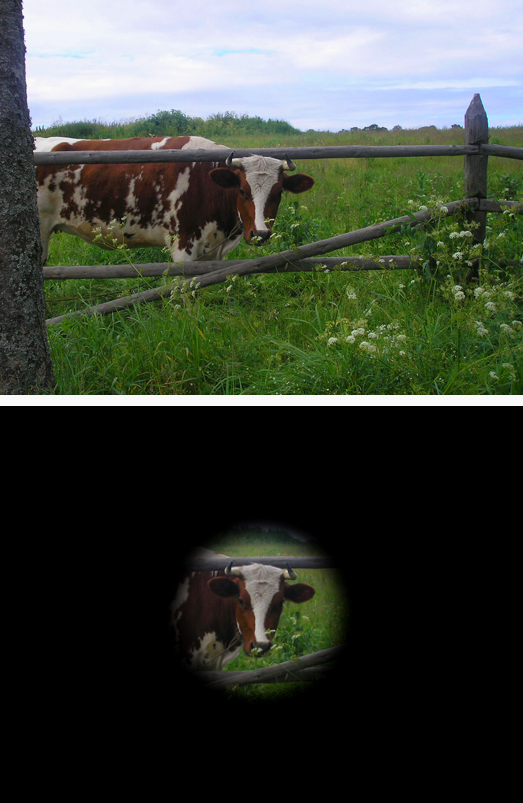
Example of tunnel vision (bottom)

The initial retinal degenerative symptoms of retinitis pigmentosa are characterized by decreased night vision (nyctalopia) and the loss of the mid-peripheral visual field. The rod photoreceptor cells, which are responsible for low-light vision and are orientated mainly in the retinal periphery, are the retinal processes affected first during non-syndromic (without other conditions) forms of this disease. Visual decline progresses relatively quickly to the far peripheral field, eventually extending into the central visual field as tunnel vision increases. Visual acuity and color vision can become compromised due to accompanying loss of the cone photoreceptor cells, which are responsible for color vision, visual acuity, and sight in the central visual field. The progression of disease occurs in both eyes in a similar but not identical pattern. A variety of indirect symptoms characterize retinitis pigmentosa along with the direct effects of the initial rod photoreceptor degeneration and later cone photoreceptor decline. Phenomena such as photophobia in which light is perceived as an intense glare, and photopsia, the presence of blinking, swirling or shimmering lights spontaneously occurring within the visual field, often manifest during the later stages of RP.

Findings related to RP have often been characterized in the fundus (back layer) of the eye as the "ophthalmic triad". This includes the development of (1) a mottled appearance of the retina and retinal pigment epithelium (RPE) that gives the same visual appearance of bone spicule patterns (but are not bone spicules), (2) a waxy yellow appearance of the optic disk, and (3) the attenuation of blood vessels in size and arterial/venous ratio as they enter and exit the optic disk of the retina and transverse it.

Non-syndromic RP (RP appears alone without other co-morbidities) usually presents a variety of the following symptoms:

- Night blindness
- Tunnel vision (due to loss of peripheral vision)
- Latticework vision (due to patchy loss of peripheral vision)
- Loss of depth perception
- Photopsia (Spontaneously occurring flashes/blinking/swirling/shimmering lights)
- Photophobia (aversion to bright lights)
- Development of the appearance of melanin pigment in a bone spicule pattern in the fundus (not bone tissue)
- Slow adjustment from dark to light environments and vice versa
- Blurring of vision
- Poor color separation
- Central vision towards the end of progression, because this is a disease of the rods, and the cones are mostly responsible for central vision (macula and fovea)
- Eventual partial or total blindness. The majority of patients do not become totally blind, often retaining limited or non-functional vision.

== Causes ==
RP may be: (1) non-syndromic, that is, it occurs alone, without any other clinical findings, (2) syndromic, with other neurosensory disorders, developmental abnormalities, or complex clinical findings, or (3) secondary to other systemic diseases.

- RP combined with deafness (congenital or progressive) is called Usher syndrome.
- Alport's syndrome is associated with RP and an abnormal glomerular-basement membrane leading to nephrotic syndrome. It is inherited as X-linked dominant.
- RP combined with ophthalmoplegia, dysphagia, ataxia, and cardiac conduction defects is seen in the mitochondrial DNA disorder Kearns–Sayre syndrome (also known as Ragged Red Fiber Myopathy).
- RP combined with intellectual disability, peripheral neuropathy, acanthotic (spiked) RBCs, ataxia, steatorrhea, and absence of VLDL is seen in abetalipoproteinemia.
- RP is seen clinically in association with several other rare genetic disorders (including muscular dystrophy and chronic granulomatous disease) as part of McLeod syndrome. This is an X-linked recessive phenotype characterized by a complete absence of XK cell surface proteins, and therefore markedly reduced expression of all Kell red blood cell antigens. For transfusion purposes, these patients are considered completely incompatible with all normal and K0/K0 donors.
- RP associated with hypogonadism, and developmental delay with an autosomal recessive inheritance pattern is seen with Bardet–Biedl syndrome.

Other conditions include neurosyphilis, toxoplasmosis and Refsum's disease.

Acquired conditions resulting in ophthalmoscopic findings resembling RP include eye inflammation associated with infection in early age (rubella, syphilis, toxoplasmosis, herpesvirus), autoimmune paraneoplastic retinopathy, drug toxicity (phenothiazines and chloroquine, less commonly with thioridazine and hydroxychloroquine), diffuse unilateral subacute neuroretinitis and eye trauma. Acquired conditions may be unilateral or bilateral, and static or progressive.

=== Genetics ===
Retinitis pigmentosa (RP) is one of the most common forms of inherited retinal degeneration.

There are multiple genes that code for proteins needed in the visual pathway that, when mutated, can cause the retinitis pigmentosa phenotype. Inheritance patterns of RP have been identified as autosomal dominant, autosomal recessive, X-linked, and maternally (mitochondrially) acquired, and are dependent on the specific RP gene mutations present in the parental generation. Autosomal Dominant RP Type 11 (PRPF-31) can be inherited as a genotype only because of incomplete penetrance, and is thus coded for in the DNA but does not manifest the disease as a phenotype. In 1989, a mutation of the gene for rhodopsin, a pigment that plays an essential part in the visual transduction cascade enabling vision in low-light conditions, was identified. The rhodopsin gene encodes a principal protein of photoreceptor outer segments. Mutations in this gene most commonly presents as missense mutations or misfolding of the rhodopsin protein, and most frequently follow autosomal dominant inheritance patterns. Since the discovery of the rhodopsin gene, more than 100 RHO mutations have been identified, accounting for 15% of all types of retinal degeneration, and approximately 25% of autosomal dominant forms of RP.

Over 100 mutations have been reported to date in the opsin gene associated with RP since the Pro23His mutation in the intradiscal domain of the protein was first reported in 1990. These mutations are found throughout the opsin gene and are distributed along the three domains of the protein (the intradiscal, transmembrane, and cytoplasmic domains). One of the main biochemical causes of RP in the case of rhodopsin mutations is protein misfolding, and the disruption of molecular chaperones. The mutation of codon 23 in the rhodopsin gene, in which proline is changed to histidine, accounts for the largest fraction of rhodopsin mutations in the United States. Several other studies have reported various codon mutations associated with retinitis pigmentosa, including Thr58Arg, Pro347Leu, Pro347Ser, as well as deletion of Ile-255. In 2000, a rare mutation in codon 23 was reported causing autosomal dominant retinitis pigmentosa, in which proline changed to alanine. However, this study showed that the retinal dystrophy associated with this mutation was characteristically mild in presentation and course. Furthermore, there was greater preservation in electroretinography amplitudes than the more prevalent Pro23His mutation.

Autosomal recessive inheritance patterns of RP have been identified in at least 45 genes. This means that two unaffected individuals who are carriers of the same RP-inducing gene mutation in diallelic form can produce offspring with the RP phenotype. A mutation on the USH2A gene is known to cause 10-15% of a syndromic form of RP known as Usher's Syndrome when inherited in an autosomal recessive fashion.

Mutations in four pre-mRNA splicing factors are known to cause autosomal dominant retinitis pigmentosa. These are PRPF3 (human PRPF3 is HPRPF3; also PRP3), PRPF8, PRPF31 and PAP1. These factors are ubiquitously expressed and it is proposed that defects in a ubiquitous factor (a protein expressed everywhere) should only cause disease in the retina because the retinal photoreceptor cells have a far greater requirement for protein processing (rhodopsin) than any other cell type.

The somatic, or X-linked inheritance patterns of RP are currently identified with the mutations of six genes, the most common occurring at specific loci in the RPGR and RP2 genes.

Types include:

OMIM	Gene	Type
400004	RPY	Retinitis pigmentosa Y-linked
180100	RP1	Retinitis pigmentosa-1
312600	RP2	Retinitis pigmentosa-2
300029	RPGR	Retinitis pigmentosa-3
613731	RHO	Retinitis pigmentosa-4
312612	/	Retinitis pigmentosa-6
608133	PRPH2	Retinitis pigmentosa-7
180104	RP9	Retinitis pigmentosa-9
180105	IMPDH1	Retinitis pigmentosa-10
600138	PRPF31 Inheritance can be either phenotypic or genotypic.	Retinitis pigmentosa-11 Autosomal Dominant
600105	CRB1	Retinitis pigmentosa-12, autosomal recessive
600059	PRPF8	Retinitis pigmentosa-13
600132	TULP1	Retinitis pigmentosa-14
600852	CA4	Retinitis pigmentosa-17
601414	HPRPF3	Retinitis pigmentosa-18
601718	ABCA4	Retinitis pigmentosa-19
613794	RPE65	Retinitis pigmentosa-20
602594	/	Retinitis pigmentosa-22
300424	OFD1	Retinitis pigmentosa-23
300155	/	Retinitis pigmentosa-24
602772	EYS	Retinitis pigmentosa-25
608380	CERKL	Retinitis pigmentosa-26
613750	NRL	Retinitis pigmentosa-27
606068	FAM161A	Retinitis pigmentosa-28
607921	FSCN2	Retinitis pigmentosa-30
609923	TOPORS	Retinitis pigmentosa-31
609913	CLCC1	Retinitis pigmentosa-32
610359	SNRNP200	Retinitis pigmentosa-33
300605	/	Retinitis pigmentosa-34
610282	SEMA4A	Retinitis pigmentosa-35
610599	PRCD	Retinitis pigmentosa-36
611131	NR2E3	Retinitis pigmentosa-37
268000	MERTK	Retinitis pigmentosa-38
268000	USH2A	Retinitis pigmentosa-39
612095	PROM1	Retinitis pigmentosa-41
612943	KLHL7	Retinitis pigmentosa-42
613810	PDE6A	Retinitis pigmentosa-43
613769	/	Retinitis pigmentosa-44
613767	CNGB1	Retinitis pigmentosa-45
612572	IDH3B	Retinitis pigmentosa-46
613758	SAG	Retinitis pigmentosa-47
613827	GUCA1B	Retinitis pigmentosa-48
613756	CNGA1	Retinitis pigmentosa-49
613194	BEST1	Retinitis pigmentosa-50
613464	TTC8	Retinitis pigmentosa-51
612712	RDH12	Retinitis pigmentosa-53
613428	C2orf71	Retinitis pigmentosa-54
613575	ARL6	Retinitis pigmentosa-55
613581	IMPG2	Retinitis pigmentosa-56
613582	PDE6G	Retinitis pigmentosa-57
613617	ZNF513	Retinitis pigmentosa-58
613861	DHDDS	Retinitis pigmentosa-59
613983	PRPF6	Retinitis pigmentosa-60
614180	CLRN1	Retinitis pigmentosa-61
614181	MAK	Retinitis pigmentosa-62
614494	/	Retinitis pigmentosa-63
614500	CFAP418	Retinitis pigmentosa-64
613660	CDHR1	Retinitis pigmentosa-65
615233	RBP3	Retinitis pigmentosa-66
615565	NEK2	Retinitis pigmentosa-67
615725	SLC7A14	Retinitis pigmentosa-68
615780	KIZ	Retinitis pigmentosa-69
615922	PRPF4	Retinitis pigmentosa-70
616394	IFT172	Retinitis pigmentosa-71
616469	ZNF408	Retinitis pigmentosa-72
616544	HGSNAT	Retinitis pigmentosa-73
616562	BBS2	Retinitis pigmentosa-74
617023	AGBL5	Retinitis pigmentosa-75
617123	POMGNT1	Retinitis pigmentosa-76
617304	REEP6	Retinitis pigmentosa-77
617433	ARHGEF18	Retinitis pigmentosa-78
617460	HK1	Retinitis pigmentosa-79
617781	IFT140	Retinitis pigmentosa-80
617871	IFT43	Retinitis pigmentosa-81
615434	ARL2BP	Retinitis pigmentosa-82
618173	ARL3	Retinitis pigmentosa-83
618220	DHX38	Retinitis pigmentosa-84
618345	AHR	Retinitis pigmentosa-85
618613	KIAA1549	Retinitis pigmentosa-86
618697	RPE65	Retinitis pigmentosa-87
618826	RP1L1	Retinitis pigmentosa-88
618955	KIF3B	Retinitis pigmentosa-89
619007	IDH3A	Retinitis pigmentosa-90
153870	IMPG1	Retinitis pigmentosa-91
619614	HKDC1	Retinitis pigmentosa-92
619845	CC2D2A	Retinitis pigmentosa-93
604232	SPATA7	Retinitis pigmentosa-94
620102	RAX2	Retinitis pigmentosa-95
620228	SAG	Retinitis pigmentosa-96
613194	BEST1	Retinitis pigmentosa, concentric
608133	PRPH2	Retinitis pigmentosa, digenic
613341	LRAT	Retinitis pigmentosa, juvenile
268000	SPATA7	Retinitis pigmentosa, juvenile, autosomal recessive
268000	CRX	Retinitis pigmentosa, late-onset dominant
300455	RPGR	Retinitis pigmentosa, X-linked, and sinorespiratory infections, with or without deafness

== Pathophysiology ==
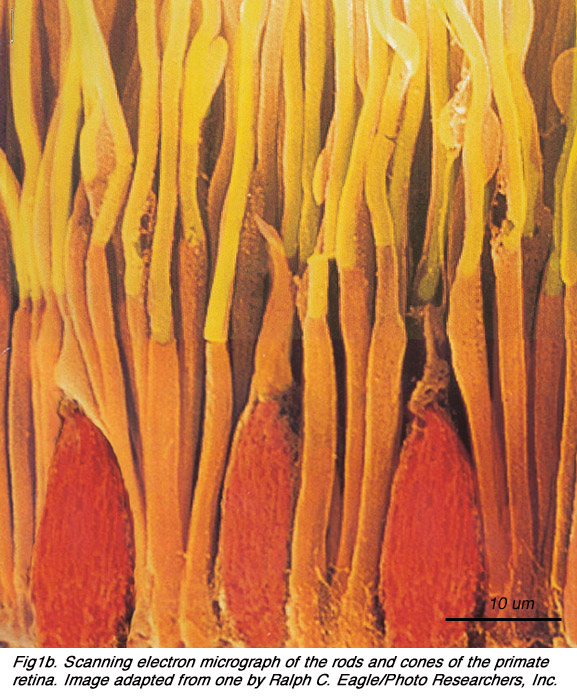
Scanning electron micrograph depicting the retinal rod and cone photoreceptors. The elongated rods are colored yellow and orange, while the shorter cones are colored red.

A variety of retinal molecular pathway defects have been matched to multiple known RP gene mutations. Mutations in the rhodopsin gene (RHO), which is responsible for the majority of autosomal-dominantly inherited RP cases, disrupts the rhodopsin protein essential for translating light into decipherable electrical signals within the phototransduction cascade of the central nervous system. Defects in the activity of this G-protein-coupled receptor are classified into distinct classes that depend on the specific folding abnormality and the resulting molecular pathway defects. The Class I mutant protein's activity is compromised as specific point mutations in the protein-coding amino acid sequence affect the pigment protein's transport to the outer segment of the eye, where the phototransduction cascade is localized. Additionally, the misfolding of Class II rhodopsin gene mutations disrupts the protein's conjunction with 11-cis-retinal to induce proper chromophore formation. Additional mutants in this pigment-encoding gene affect protein stability, disrupt mRNA integrity post-translationally, and affect the activation rates of transducin and opsin optical proteins.

Additionally, animal models suggest that the retinal pigment epithelium fails to phagocytose the outer rod segment discs that have been shed, leading to an accumulation of outer rod segment debris. In mice that are homozygous recessive for retinal degeneration mutation, rod photoreceptors stop developing and undergo degeneration before cellular maturation completes. A defect in cGMP-phosphodiesterase has also been documented; this leads to toxic levels of cGMP.

Oxidative damage associated with lipid peroxidation is a potential cause of cone cell death in retinitis pigmentosa.

== Diagnosis ==
An accurate diagnosis of retinitis pigmentosa relies on the documentation of the progressive loss of photoreceptor cell function, confirmed by a combination of visual field and visual acuity tests, fundus and optical coherence imagery, and electroretinography (ERG).

Visual field and acuity tests measure and compare the size of the patient's field of vision and the clarity of their visual perception with the standard visual measurements associated with healthy 20/20 vision. Clinical diagnostic features indicative of retinitis pigmentosa include a substantially small and progressively decreasing visual area in the visual field test, and compromised levels of clarity measured during the visual acuity test. Additionally, optical tomography such as fundus and retinal (optical coherence) imagery provide further diagnostic tools when determining an RP diagnosis. Photographing the back of the dilated eye allows the confirmation of bone spicule accumulation in the fundus, which presents during the later stages of RP retinal degeneration. Combined with cross-sectional imagery of optical coherence tomography, which provides clues into photoreceptor thickness, retinal layer morphology, and retinal pigment epithelium physiology, fundus imagery can help determine the state of RP progression.

While visual field and acuity test results combined with retinal imagery support the diagnosis of retinitis pigmentosa, additional testing is necessary to confirm other pathological features of this disease. Electroretinography (ERG) confirms the RP diagnosis by evaluating functional aspects associated with photoreceptor degeneration, and can detect physiological abnormalities before the initial manifestation of symptoms. An electrode lens is applied to the eye as photoreceptor response to varying degrees of quick light pulses is measured. Patients exhibiting the retinitis pigmentosa phenotype would show decreased or delayed electrical response in the rod photoreceptors, as well as possibly compromised cone photoreceptor cell response.

The patient's family history is also considered when determining a diagnosis due to the genetic mode of inheritance of retinitis pigmentosa. At least 35 different genes or loci are known to cause nonsyndromic RP. Indications of the RP mutation type can be determined through DNA testing, which is available on a clinical basis for:

- RLBP1 (autosomal recessive, Bothnia type RP)
- RP1 (autosomal dominant, RP1)
- RHO (autosomal dominant, RP4)
- RDS (autosomal dominant, RP7)
- PRPF8 (autosomal dominant, RP13)
- PRPF3 (autosomal dominant, RP18)
- CRB1 (autosomal recessive, RP12)
- ABCA4 (autosomal recessive, RP19)
- RPE65 (autosomal recessive, RP20)

For all other genes (e.g. DHDDS), molecular genetic testing is available on a research basis only.

RP can be inherited in an autosomal dominant, autosomal recessive, X-linked or Y-linked manner. X-linked RP can be either recessive, affecting primarily only males, or dominant, affecting both males and females, although males are usually more mildly affected. Some digenic (controlled by two genes) and mitochondrial forms have also been described.

Genetic counseling depends on an accurate diagnosis, determination of the mode of inheritance in each family, and results of molecular genetic testing.

== Treatment ==
There is currently no cure for retinitis pigmentosa, but the efficacy and safety of various prospective treatments are currently being evaluated. The efficiency of various supplements, such as vitamin A, DHA, NAC, and lutein, in delaying disease progression remains an unresolved, yet prospective treatment option. Clinical trials investigating optic prosthetic devices, gene therapy mechanisms, and retinal sheet transplantations are active areas of study in the partial restoration of vision in retinitis pigmentosa patients.

=== Nutrition ===
Studies have demonstrated the delay of rod photoreceptor degeneration by the daily intake of 15000 IU (equivalent to 4.5 mg) of vitamin A palmitate; thus, stalling disease progression in some patients. 2007 investigations have shown that proper vitamin A supplementation can postpone blindness by up to 10 years (by reducing the 10% loss pa to 8.3% pa) in some patients in certain stages of the disease.

A 2020 Cochrane review finds insufficient evidence to draw a conclusion on whether there is a benefit with Vitamin A, DHA, or the combination of both.

A phase II study published in 2022 finds favorable results in patients receiving a combination supplement ("nutraceutical") of Vitamin A, carotenoid (lutein and zeaxanthin), and antioxidants (selenium, etc.) over placebo. The manufacturer helped with patient recruitment and supplement distribution.

=== Cell transplantation ===
Transplanting pigment cells onto the retina to complete the circuitry has always been an appealing idea, but remains investigational. Human trials have been done for a variety of cell types, both autologous (from the patient) and allogeneic (from other humans).

==== Autologous bone marrow derived stem cells ====
MD Stem Cells, a clinical research company using autologous bone marrow derived stem cells (BMSC) in the treatment of retinal and optic nerve disease, published results from the Retinitis Pigmentosa cohort within their ongoing NIH registered Stem Cell Ophthalmology Study II (SCOTS2) clinical trial (NCT 03011541). Outcomes were encouraging with 45.5% of eyes showing an average of 7.9 lines of improvement (40.9% LogMAR improvement over baseline) and 45.5% of eyes showing stable acuity over the follow-up. Results were statistically significant(p=0.016). Retinitis Pigmentosa continues to be treated and evaluated in the study.

=== Argus retinal prosthesis ===
The Argus retinal prosthesis became the first approved treatment for the disease in February 2011, and is currently available in Germany, France, Italy, and the UK. Interim results on 30 patients long term trials were published in 2012. The Argus II retinal implant has also received market approval in the US. The device may help adults with RP who have lost the ability to perceive shapes and movement to be more mobile and to perform day-to-day activities. In June 2013, twelve hospitals in the US announced they would soon accept consultation for patients with RP in preparation for the launch of Argus II later that year. The Alpha-IMS is a subretinal implant involving the surgical implantation of a small image-recording chip beneath the optic fovea. Measures of visual improvements from Alpha-IMS studies require the demonstration of the device's safety before proceeding with clinical trials and granting market approval.

=== Gene therapy ===
The goal of gene therapy studies is to virally supplement retinal cells expressing mutant genes associated with the retinitis pigmentosa phenotype with healthy forms of the gene; thus, allowing the repair and proper functioning of retinal photoreceptor cells in response to the instructions associated with the inserted healthy gene. Clinical trials investigating the insertion of the healthy RPE65 gene in retinas expressing the LCA2 retinitis pigmentosa phenotype measured modest improvements in vision; however, the degradation of retinal photoreceptors continued at the disease-related rate. Likely, gene therapy may preserve remaining healthy retinal cells while failing to repair the earlier accumulation of damage in already diseased photoreceptor cells. Response to gene therapy would theoretically benefit young patients exhibiting the shortest progression of photoreceptor decline; thus, correlating to a higher possibility of cell rescue via the healthy inserted gene.

=== Drugs ===
One study at UC Berkeley found that disulfiram, a drug used to treat alcoholism by causing an aversive reaction in humans, had potential to partially restore vision loss in rats with retinitis pigmentosa, even during late stages of the disease. It specifically works by inhibiting retinoic acid synthesis. A retinoic acid receptor inhibitor, which would not have the side effects of disulfiram when combined with alcohol, has the same effect. Efforts to continue research in humans is ongoing.

There is also one form of Gene therapy for the RPE65 gene that had been approved by the Food and Drug Administration which is called Voretigene neparvovec which can help people with the condition if it is caused by the RPE65 gene. However there are no other approved therapies for the other genes that can cause the condition. It is also believed that high levels of Vitamin E can make the condition worse, so it is advised not to take excessive amounts. It is also advised to wear sunglasses that protect the wearer from harsh UV light as this can also damage the retinas.

== Prognosis ==
The progressive nature of and lack of a definitive cure for retinitis pigmentosa contribute to the inevitably discouraging outlook for patients with this disease. While complete blindness is rare, the person's visual acuity and visual field will continue to decline as initial rod photoreceptor and later cone photoreceptor degradation proceeds.

Studies indicate that children carrying the disease genotype benefit from presymptomatic counseling in order to prepare for the physical and social implications associated with progressive vision loss. While the psychological prognosis can be slightly alleviated with active counseling the physical implications and progression of the disease depend largely on the age of initial symptom manifestation and the rate of photoreceptor degradation, rather than access to prospective treatments. Corrective visual aids and personalized vision therapy provided by low vision specialists may help patients correct slight disturbances in visual acuity and optimize their remaining visual field. Support groups, vision insurance, and lifestyle therapy are additional useful tools for those managing progressive visual decline.

== Epidemiology ==
Retinitis pigmentosa is the leading cause of inherited blindness, with approximately 1/4,000 individuals experiencing the non-syndromic form of their disease within their lifetime. It is estimated that 1.5 million people worldwide are currently affected. Early onset RP occurs within the first few years of life and is typically associated with syndromic disease forms, while late onset RP emerges from early to mid-adulthood.

Autosomal dominant and recessive forms of retinitis pigmentosa affect both male and female populations equally; however, the less frequent X-linked form of the disease affects male recipients of the X-linked mutation, while females usually remain unaffected carriers of the RP trait. The X-linked forms of the disease are considered severe, and typically lead to complete blindness during later stages. In rare occasions, a dominant form of the X-linked gene mutation will affect both males and females equally.

Due to the genetic inheritance patterns of RP, many isolate populations exhibit higher disease frequencies or increased prevalence of a specific RP mutation. Pre-existing or emerging mutations that contribute to rod photoreceptor degeneration in retinitis pigmentosa are passed down through familial lines; thus, allowing certain RP cases to be concentrated to specific geographical regions with an ancestral history of the disease. Several hereditary studies have been performed to determine the varying prevalence rates in Maine (USA), Birmingham (England), Switzerland (affects 1/7000), Denmark (affects 1/2500), and Norway. Navajo Indians display an elevated rate of RP inheritance as well, which is estimated as affecting 1 in 1878 individuals. Despite the increased frequency of RP within specific familial lines, the disease is considered non-discriminatory and tends to equally affect all world populations.

== Research ==
Future treatments may involve retinal transplants, artificial retinal implants, gene therapy, stem cells, nutritional supplements, and/or drug therapies.

2012: Scientists at the University of Miami Bascom Palmer Eye Institute presented data showing protection of photoreceptors in an animal model when eyes were injected with mesencephalic astrocyte-derived neurotrophic factor (MANF). Researchers at the University of California, Berkeley were able to restore vision to blind mice by exploiting a "photoswitch" that activates retinal ganglion cells in animals with damaged rod and cone cells.

2015: A study by Bakondi et al. at Cedars-Sinai Medical Center showed that CRISPR/Cas9 can be used to treat rats with the autosomal dominant form of retinitis pigmentosa. Researchers find that two molecules, rod-derived cone viability factor (RdCVF) and Nrf2, can protect cone photoreceptors in mouse models of retinitis pigmentosa.

2016: RetroSense Therapeutics aimed to inject viruses with DNA from light-sensitive algae into the eyes of several blind people (who have retinitis pigmentosa). If successful, they will be able to see in black and white.

In 2017 the FDA approved the gene therapy voretigene neparvovec to treat people with biallelic RPE65 mutation-associated retinal dystrophy.

In 2020, a literature review estimated the experimental therapeutic technique called transcorneal electrical stimulation as "probably effective" (level B) in retinitis pigmentosa, based on the evidence available at that time.

In 2021 an optogenetics application of the protein Channelrhodopsin in a human patient was reported with partial recovery of non-functional vision in a series of one patient only. They did not use standard protocol to measure visual improvement, but created their own criteria. The serendipitous discovery of the novel algal channelrhodopsin used came out of the 1000 Plant Genomes Project.

In 2026, a project led by the Institute for Bioengineering of Catalonia (IBEC) developed molecular photoswitches of mGlu_{6} receptors ('prosthe6') that restore visual acuity in blinded zebrafish larvae and restore visually guided behavior in mouse models of macular degeneration and retinitis pigmentosa independently of the causing genetic mutation. They work by photopharmacologically controlling the activity of ON bipolar cells that survive retinal degeneration, and mimicking their physiological activity. An animation describes the mechanism of action of prosthe6 compounds in the retinal circuit.

== Notable cases ==
- Jennifer L. Armentrout, American author of YA paranormal and Science Fiction
- Walt Bodine. American broadcaster, Kansas City
- Willie Brown, 41st Mayor of San Francisco, California
- Alex Bulmer, Canadian playwright
- Molly Burke, Canadian YouTuber and motivational speaker
- Mark Erelli, American singer/songwriter, guitarist for Lori McKenna
- Neil Fachie, British paralympic cyclist
- William (Bill) Fulton, urban planner, author, and former Mayor of Ventura, California
- Gordon Gund, American businessman and professional sports team owner
- Rigo Tovar, Mexican musician, singer and actor
- Lindy Hou, Australian tandem cyclist and triathlete
- Amar Latif, entrepreneur, television personality and professional traveller
- Rachael Leahcar, Australian singer/songwriter, actress and motivational speaker
- Steve Lonegan, Mayor of Bogota, New Jersey; Republican candidate for U.S. Senate
- Chris McCausland, British stand-up comedian and actor
- Robin Millar, English record producer, musician and businessman
- Woody Shaw, American jazz trumpeter
- Regina Sorenson, Australian television personality
- Shel Talmy, American record producer, songwriter and arranger
- Sabriye Tenberken, German Tibetologist and developer of Tibetan Braille
- Danelle Umstead, American Paralympic alpine skier, Dancing with the Stars contestant
- Jon Wellner, American actor
- Steve Wynn, American business magnate and Las Vegas casino developer
- Sheena Iyengar, S.T. Lee Professor of Business in the Management Department at Columbia Business School
- Yudai Shimazu - Japanese athlete

== See also ==
- Cone dystrophy
- List of eye diseases and disorders
- Progressive retinal atrophy for the condition in dogs
- Retinitis pigmentosa GTPase regulator
- Retinitis Pigmentosa International
