= Leber congenital amaurosis =

Rare inherited eye disease

- Other names: Leber's congenital amaurosis
- Specialty: Ophthalmology
- Symptoms: Visual impairment, sensitivity to light
- Types: > 12 types
- Causes: Genetic (autosomal recessive)
- Frequency: 1 in 40,000 newborns

Leber congenital amaurosis (LCA) is a rare inherited eye disease that appears at birth or in the first few months of life.

It affects about 1 in 40,000 newborns. LCA was first described by Theodor Leber in the 19th century. It should not be confused with Leber's hereditary optic neuropathy, which is a different disease also described by Theodor Leber.

One form of LCA was successfully treated with gene therapy in 2008.

== Signs and symptoms ==
LCA symptoms typically begin in the first few months of life, most commonly with involuntary twitching of the eye (nystagmus). Affected infants may show misaligned eyes when looking at something (strabismus), aversion to light (photophobia), and poke or rub at their eyes (Franceschetti's oculodigital sign). Those with LCA invariably experience vision problems. Affected infants show decreased visual response to objects. Loss of visual acuity is severe, with affected individuals' vision ranging from 20/200 to 20/400. (Note: With 20/200 vision, one can clearly see at 20 feet what would typically be seen clearly at 200 feet.) Around a third of those affected completely lose perception of light.

At an eye exam, the pupils may not respond normally to light. Some affected individuals have cloudy eyes (cataracts), and irregularly shaped corneas (keratoconus). Retinal exams typically look normal, especially in the young, though retinal abnormalities can appear later in life.

Aside from eye problems, children with LCA are typically healthy.

== Cause ==
LCA is a genetic disease and can be caused by pathogenic variants in at least 28 different genes. Variants in three of these genes – IMPDH1, OTX2, and CRX – can cause LCA in an autosomal dominant manner, meaning inheriting a single copy of a pathogenic variant can result in disease. Variants in the remaining genes associated with LCA cause disease in an autosomal recessive manner, meaning one must inherit copies of the pathogenic variant from both parents to develop LCA. Genes associated with LCA have a variety of roles in the development of the eye:

- OTX2 is involved in the development of the retina;
- CRB1, CRX, GDF6, and PRPH2 in the formation of retinal photoreceptor cells;
- AIPL1 and GUCY2D in phototransduction (converting light into electrical signals for the brain);
- ALMS1, CCT2, CEP290, CLUAP1, IFT140, IQCB1, LCA5, MYO7A, RD3, RPGRIP1, SPATA7, and TULP1 in maintaining the cilia on photoreceptor cells;
- LRAT, RDH12, and RPE65 in replenishing retinal levels for the visual cycle;
- IMPDH1 in guanine synthesis (involved in maintaining retinal levels);
- CABP4, CNGA3, and KCNJ13 in photoreceptor response to light.

Pathogenic variants of any of these genes cause dysfunction in those associated processes, which leads to severe vision loss. Variants in DTHD1 and NMNAT1 also cause LCA, though these genes' roles in vision development are not yet known.

Among the gene variants that cause LCA, CEP290 and GUCYD variants are the most common, each causing up to 20% of LCA cases. Other common variants are in CRB1 (around 10% of cases), RPE65 (up to 10%), AIPL1 (up to 8%), RDH12 (up to 5%), and RPGRIP1 (around 5%). Around 25% of people with LCA do not have any of the known LCA-causing pathogenic gene variants; the cause of their LCA is unknown.

== Diagnosis ==
LCA is diagnosed clinically, by a combination of vision loss, an abnormal response of the pupils to light, and by abnormal response to electroretinography, a test that measures the electrical response of the retina to light.

== Treatment ==
One form of LCA, in patients with LCA2 bearing a mutation in the RPE65 gene, has been successfully treated in clinical trials using gene therapy. The results of three early clinical trials were published in 2008 demonstrating the safety and efficacy of using adeno-associated virus to deliver gene therapy to restore vision in LCA patients. In all three clinical trials, patients recovered functional vision without apparent side effects. These studies, which used adeno-associated virus, have spawned a number of new studies investigating gene therapy for human retinal disease. On 19 December 2017, the U.S. Food and Drug Administration approved voretigene neparvovec-rzyl (Luxturna), an adeno-associated virus vector-based gene therapy for children and adults with biallelic RPE65 gene mutations responsible for retinal dystrophy, including Leber congenital amaurosis. Patients must have viable retinal cells as a prerequisite for the intraocular administration of Luxturna. Another recent trial from The OHSU Casey Eye Institute used CRISPR to treat LCA starting in 2020. The experimental treatment consisted in editing a mutation of the CEP290 gene, which provides instructions to create a protein that is critical for sight. Results were released in 2023 with 79% of the patients showing improvement in at least one of four measured outcomes.

For those who cannot benefit from gene therapy, LCA treatment is supportive, and meant to facilitate living with visual impairment. Some benefit from vision aids such as glasses, magnifiers, and enhancers. Other resources helpful for those with visual impairment include educational programs, special education teachers, and service animals.

== Epidemiology ==
Around 2–3 out of every 100,000 people have LCA – an estimated 180,000 people worldwide. LCA is a common cause of blindness in the young; around 20% of children in schools for the blind have LCA.

== History ==
LCA was originally described as a variety of retinitis pigmentosa by Theodor Leber in 1869.

== Popular culture ==
- In the episode "The Blackout in the Blizzard" (Season 6, Episode 16) of the television drama Bones, Dr. Jack Hodgins and his pregnant wife Angela Montenegro, who is an LCA carrier, have to wait during a citywide blackout for Hodgins's genetic test results, to see if he is also an LCA carrier. He does indeed turn out to be a carrier, giving their unborn child a 25% chance of having LCA.
- In the television series ER (Season 14, Episode 12 "Believe the Unseen") Dr. Abby Lockhart diagnoses a young foster girl with Leber congenital amaurosis. The girl to this point hid her condition from her foster families. The episode contains some information about symptoms, clinical diagnosis and mentions gene replacement therapy and clinical trials as hope for help in managing the condition.
- In the Korean drama The King of Dramas (Episode 16, "In Search of Lost Time") Anthony Kim, played by Kim Myung-min, is diagnosed with Leber congenital amaurosis, the same disease that made his mother blind.
- Four-year-old Gavin who suffers from a form of LCA was made famous in 2013 by a YouTube video showing him using his white cane for the first time to navigate down a curb. He later appeared on the TV show Little Big Shots.

=== Notable cases ===
- Akbar Khan, musician and disability activist from India
- Alexandre Lloveras, French para-cyclist who represented France at the 2020 Summer Paralympics.
- Anthony Ferraro, American athlete and social media personality
- Bianca Borgella, Canadian para-athlete
- Jada, daughter of Derrek Leon Lee an American former professional baseball first baseman.
- Jason Dunkerley, a Canadian Paralympian athlete
- Kelvin Tan, a Singaporean former Mandopop singer
- Kim Umback, a Canadian cross-country skier
- Kody Keplinger, American author of young adult and middle grade books
- Letticia Martinez, an American Paralympic swimmer who is both long course and short course American record holder
- Scott Douglas MacIntyre, American singer, songwriter, and pianist, and the eighth place finalist on the eighth season of American Idol.
- Tom Pernice Jr.'s daughter, an American professional golfer

== See also ==
- Visual cycle
