= Guanylate cyclase =

Lyase enzyme that synthesizes cGMP from GTP

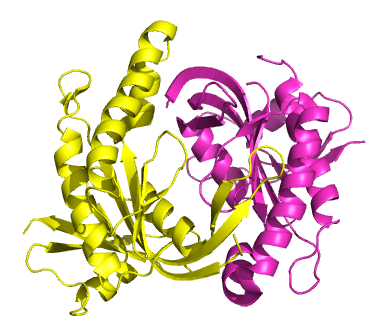
- catalytic domain of human soluble guanylate cyclase 1. PDB 3uvj

Identifiers
- EC no.: 4.6.1.2
- CAS no.: 9054-75-5

Databases
- BRENDA: enzyme data
- ExPASy: NiceZyme view
- KEGG: enzyme entry
- MetaCyc: metabolic pathway
- Rhea: reactions
- PDB structures: RCSB PDB PDBe PDBsum
- Gene Ontology: AmiGO / QuickGO
Search
- PMC: articles
- PubMed: articles
- NCBI: proteins

Guanylate cyclase (EC 4.6.1.2, also known as guanyl cyclase, guanylyl cyclase, or GC; systematic name GTP diphosphate-lyase (cyclizing; 3′,5′-cyclic-GMP-forming)) is a lyase enzyme that converts guanosine triphosphate (GTP) to cyclic guanosine monophosphate (cGMP) and pyrophosphate:

GTP = 3′,5′-cyclic GMP + diphosphate

It is often part of the G protein signaling cascade that is activated by low intracellular calcium levels and inhibited by high intracellular calcium levels. In response to calcium levels, guanylate cyclase synthesizes cGMP from GTP. cGMP keeps cGMP-gated channels open, allowing for the entry of calcium into the cell.

Like cAMP, cGMP is an important second messenger that internalizes the message carried by intercellular messengers such as peptide hormones and nitric oxide and can also function as an autocrine signal. Depending on cell type, it can drive adaptive/developmental changes requiring protein synthesis. In smooth muscle, cGMP is the signal for relaxation, and is coupled to many homeostatic mechanisms including regulation of vasodilation, vocal tone, insulin secretion, and peristalsis. Once formed, cGMP can be degraded by phosphodiesterases, which themselves are under different forms of regulation, depending on the tissue.

== Reaction ==
Guanylate cyclase catalyzes the reaction of guanosine triphosphate (GTP) to 3',5'-cyclic guanosine monophosphate (cGMP) and pyrophosphate:

GTP

cGMP

== Effects ==
Guanylate cyclase is found in the retina (RETGC) and modulates visual phototransduction in rods and cones. It is part of the calcium negative feedback system that is activated in response to the hyperpolarization of the photoreceptors by light. This causes less intracellular calcium, which stimulates guanylate cyclase-activating proteins (GCAPs). Studies have shown that cGMP synthesis in cones is about 5-10 times higher than it is in rods, which may play an important role in modulating cone adaption to light. In addition, studies have shown that zebrafish express a higher number of GCAPs than mammals, and that zebrafish GCAPs can bind at least three calcium ions.

Guanylate cyclase 2C (GC-C) is an enzyme expressed mainly in intestinal neurons. Activation of GC-C amplifies the excitatory cell response that is modulated by glutamate and acetylcholine receptors. GC-C, while known mainly for its secretory regulation in the intestinal epithelium, is also expressed in the brain. To be specific, it is found in the somata and dendrites of dopaminergic neurons in the ventral tegmental area (VTA) and the substantia nigra. Some studies implicate this pathway as having a role in attention deficiency and hyperactive behavior.

Soluble guanylate cyclase contains a molecule of heme, and is activated primarily by the binding of nitric oxide (NO) to that heme. sGC is primary receptor for NO a gaseous, membrane-soluble neurotransmitter. sGC expression has been shown to be highest in the striatum compared to other brain regions and has been explored as a possible candidate for restoring striatal dysfunction in Parkinson's disease. sGC acts as an intracellular intermediary for regulating dopamine and glutamate. Upregulation, which creates neuronal sensitivity, of the cGMP in a dopamine-depleted striatum has been associated with the symptoms of Parkinson's. Increased intracellular cGMP has been shown to contribute to excessive neuron excitability and locomotor activity. Activation of this pathway can also stimulate presynaptic glutamate release and cause an upregulation of AMPA receptors postsynaptically.

== Types ==
There are membrane-bound (type 1, guanylate cyclase-coupled receptor) and soluble (type 2, soluble guanylate cyclase) forms of guanylate cyclases.

Membrane bound guanylate cyclases include an external ligand-binding domain (e.g., for peptide hormones such as BNP and ANP), a transmembrane domain, and an internal catalytic domain homologous to adenylyl cyclases. Recently, a directly light-gated guanylate cyclase has been discovered in an aquatic fungus.

In the mammalian retina, two forms of guanylate cyclase have been identified, each encoded by separate genes; RETGC-1 and RETGC-2. RETGC-1 has been found to be expressed in higher levels in cones compared to rod cells. Studies have also shown that mutations in the RETGC-1 gene can lead to cone-rod dystrophy by disrupting the phototransduction processes.

== Mutations ==
Cone dystrophy (COD) is a retinal degradation of photoreceptor function wherein cone function is lost at the onset of the dystrophy but rod function is preserved until almost the end. COD has been linked to several genetic mutations including mutations in the guanylate cyclase activator 1A (GUCA1A) and guanylate cyclase 2D (GUY2D) among other enzymes. To be specific, GUY2D codes for RETGC-1, which is involved in cone adaptation and photoreceptor sensitivity by synthesizing cGMP. Low concentrations of calcium cause the dimerization of RETGC-1 proteins through stimulation from guanylate cyclase-activating proteins (GCAP). This process happens at amino acids 817-857, and mutations in this region increase RETGC-1 affinity for GCAP. This works to alter the calcium sensitivity of the neuron by allowing mutant RETGC-1 to be activated by GCAP at higher calcium levels than the wild-type. Because RETGC-1 produces cGMP, which keeps cyclic nucleotide-gated channels open allowing the influx of calcium, this mutation causes extremely high intracellular calcium levels. Calcium, which plays many roles in the cell and is tightly regulated, disrupts the membrane when it appears in excess. Also, calcium is linked to apoptosis by causing the release of cytochrome c. Therefore, mutations in the RETGC-1 can cause COD by increasing intracellular calcium levels and stimulating cone photoreceptor death.

== See also ==
- Adenylyl cyclase
- Cyclic guanosine monophosphate
- Guanylyl cyclase activator (protein)
