= Guanylate cyclase-coupled receptor =

Receptor guanylyl cyclase

Identifiers
- Symbol: GUCY
- Pfam: PF00211
- InterPro: IPR001054
- Membranome: 49
Available protein structures:
- Pfam: structures / ECOD
- PDB: RCSB PDB; PDBe; PDBj
- PDBsum: structure summary

Natriuretic peptide receptor

Identifiers
- Symbol: ANPR
- InterPro: IPR001170
- Membranome: 1131

Guanylate cyclase-coupled receptors, receptor guanylate cyclases or membrane-bound guanylyl cyclases are single-pass transmembrane proteins. Guanylate cyclase-coupled receptor on cell surface consists of two parts: the extracellular part, or the receptor domain, and the intracellular part, or the guanylate cyclase activity domain. When the receptor is activated by the ligation, it can cyclize the guanylate into cGMP. An example of Guanylate cyclase-coupled receptors is ANF receptors (NPR1, NPR2 and NPR3) in kidney. Additionally, there exist intracellular guanylate cyclase-coupled receptor like soluble NO-activated guanylate cyclase.

They are enzyme-linked receptors:

- GC-A (NPR1/GUCY2A) & GC-B (NPR2/GUCY2B): for natriuretic factors such as atrial natriuretic factor (ANF).
- GC-C (GUCY2C): for guanylin and uroguanylin.
- GC-D (GUCY2D)
- GC-E (GUCY2E)
- GC-F (GUCY2F)

There is also a human pseudogene for GUCY2GP.
