= PRPF31 =

Protein-coding gene in the species Homo sapiens

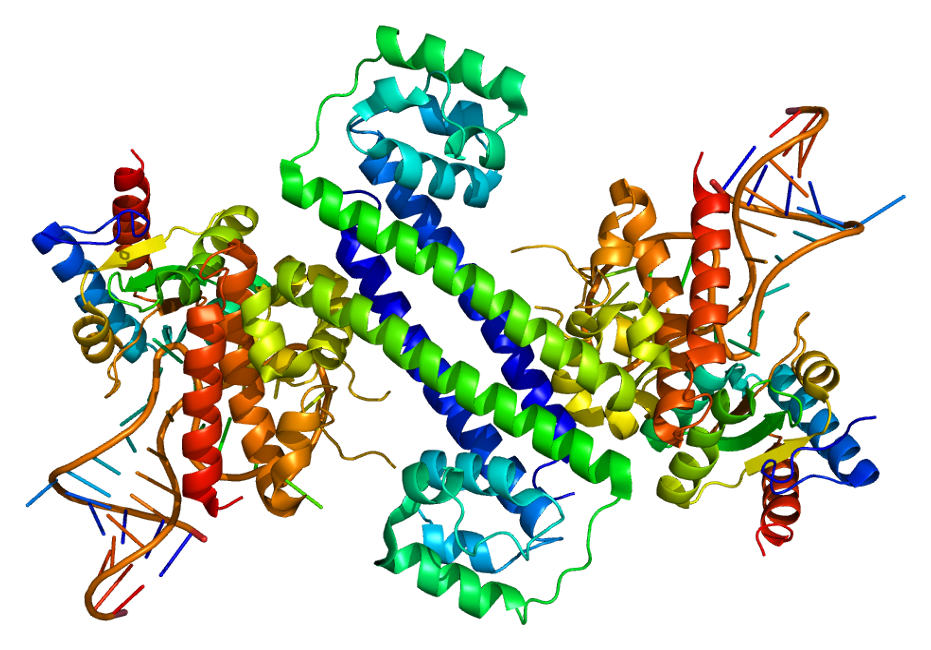

Identifiers
- Aliases: PRPF31, pre-mRNA processing factor 31, NY-BR-99, PRP31, RP11, SNRNP61
- External IDs: OMIM: 606419; MGI: 1916238; GeneCards: PRPF31
Available structures
| PDB | Ortholog search: PDBe RCSB |
| PDB | List of PDB id codes 2OZB, 3SIU, 3SIV, 3JCR,%%s3JCR |

Gene location (Human)
| Chr. | Chromosome 19 (human) |
| Band | 19q13.42 | Start | 54,115,410 bp |
| Band | 19q13.42 | End | 54,131,719 bp |

Gene location (Mouse)
| Chr. | Chromosome 7 (mouse) |
| Band | 7|7 A1 | Start | 3,632,984 bp |
| Band | 7|7 A1 | End | 3,645,485 bp |
RNA expression pattern
| Bgee | Human / Mouse (ortholog); Top expressed in: stromal cell of endometrium; granulocyte; ventricular zone; ganglionic eminence; muscle layer of sigmoid colon; placenta; body of uterus; apex of heart; right ovary; tibial arteries / Top expressed in: primitive streak; yolk sac; ventricular zone; neural layer of retina; dentate gyrus of hippocampal formation granule cell; endothelial cell of lymphatic vessel; epiblast; hair follicle; embryo; embryo; More reference expression data |
| BioGPS | n/a |
Gene ontology
| Molecular function | snRNP binding; U4 snRNA binding; U4atac snRNA binding; protein binding; ribonucleoprotein complex binding; RNA binding |
| Cellular component | Cajal body; nuclear speck; U4/U6 x U5 tri-snRNP complex; U4atac snRNP; nucleoplasm; MLL1 complex; U2-type spliceosomal complex; precatalytic spliceosome; spliceosomal complex; U4 snRNP; nucleus; U2-type precatalytic spliceosome |
| Biological process | mRNA splicing, via spliceosome; spliceosomal tri-snRNP complex assembly; mRNA processing; snoRNA localization; ribonucleoprotein complex localization; RNA splicing |
Sources:Amigo / QuickGO
Orthologs
| Databases | NCBI: entry; OMA: entry |
| Species | Human | Mouse |
| Entrez | 26121 | 68988 |
| Ensembl | ENSG00000275885; ENSG00000105618 | ENSMUSG00000008373 |
| UniProt | Q8WWY3 | Q8CCF0 |
| RefSeq (mRNA) | NM_015629 | NM_001159714; NM_027328 |
| RefSeq (protein) | NP_056444; NP_056444.3 | NP_001153186; NP_081604 |
| Location (UCSC) | Chr 19: 54.12 – 54.13 Mb | Chr 7: 3.63 – 3.65 Mb |
| PubMed search |
- Wikidata
| View/Edit Human | View/Edit Mouse |

PRP31 pre-mRNA processing factor 31 homolog (S. cerevisiae), also known as PRPF31, is a protein which in humans is encoded by the PRPF31 gene.

== Function ==
PRPF31 is the gene coding for the splicing factor hPRP31. It is essential for the formation of the spliceosome hPRP31 is associated with the U4/U6 di-snRNP and interacts with another splicing factor, hPRP6, to form the U4/U6-U5 tri-snRNP. It has been shown that when hPRP31 is knocked down by RNAi, U4/U6 di-snRNPs accumulate in the Cajal bodies and the U4/U6-U5 tri-snRNP cannot form.

PRPF31 is recruited to introns following the attachment of U4 and U6 RNAs and the 15.5K protein NHP2L1. The addition of PRPF31 is crucial for the transition of the spliceosomal complex to the activated state.

== Clinical significance ==
A mutation in PRPF31 is one of 4 known mutations in splicing factors which are known to cause retinitis pigmentosa. The first mutation in PRPF31 was discovered by Vithana et al. in 2001. Retinitis pigmentosa (RP) is a clinically and genetically heterogeneous group of retinal dystrophies characterized by a progressive degeneration of photoreceptors, eventually resulting in severe visual impairment.

== Inheritance ==
Mutations in PRPF31 are inherited in an autosomal dominant manner, accounting for 2.5% of cases of autosomal dominant retinitis pigmentosa (adRP) in a mixed UK population. However, the inheritance pattern of PRPF31 mutations is atypical of dominant inheritance, showing the phenomenon of partial penetrance, whereby a dominant mutations appear to "skip" generations. This is thought to be due to the presence of two wild type alleles, a high-expressivity allele and a low-expressivity allele. If a patient has a mutant allele and a high-expressivity allele, they do not show disease phenotype. If a patient has a mutant allele and a low-expressivity allele, the residual level of protein falls beneath the threshold for normal function, and so they do show disease phenotype. The inheritance pattern of PRPF31 can therefore be thought of as a variation of haploinsufficiency. This variant of haploinsufficiency is only seen in two other human diseases: Erythropoietic protoporphyria, caused by mutations in the FECH gene; and hereditary elliptocytosis, caused by mutations in the spectrin gene.
