= Electro stimulation =

Electro-stimulation is stimulation using electricity.

It can be used in the context of:

- Animal husbandry as part of the artificial insemination process
- Bioelectromagnetics
  - Cranial electrotherapy stimulation
  - Transcranial magnetic stimulation
  - Transcorneal electrical stimulation
- Electrical muscle stimulation
  - Bio-electric stimulation therapy
  - Functional electrical stimulation
  - Erotic electrostimulation, sometimes a form of BDSM
