= X-linked cone-rod dystrophy, type 1 =

- Other names: CORDX1, CORD1, Cone-rod dystrophy X-linked 1.
- Specialty: Medical genetics, optometry, ophthalmology
- Usual onset: Early infancy
- Duration: Lifelong
- Causes: Genetic mutation
- Prevention: none
- Prognosis: Medium
- Frequency: rare
- Deaths: -

X-linked cone-rod dystrophy, type 1 is a rare progressive genetic disorder of the vision which is characterized by progressive myopia, photophobia, abnormal color perception, lowered photopic electroretinigraphic response, and macular retinal pigment epithelium granularity. The severity of the symptoms is variable. Peripheral vision is unaffected in most of the cases. It is one of the three types of X-linked cone-rod dystrophy.

This condition is linked to mutations (c.2383G > T, p.E795X) in the RPGR gene, located in the Xp11.4 region of the X chromosome, and it is inherited in an X-linked dominant manner with full penetrance, because of this, it mostly affects males.

Prevalence is unknown, although usual cone-rod dystrophy has a prevalence of around 1-9 out of 40,000-100,000 live births.
