= TXNL4B =

Protein-coding gene in the species Homo sapiens

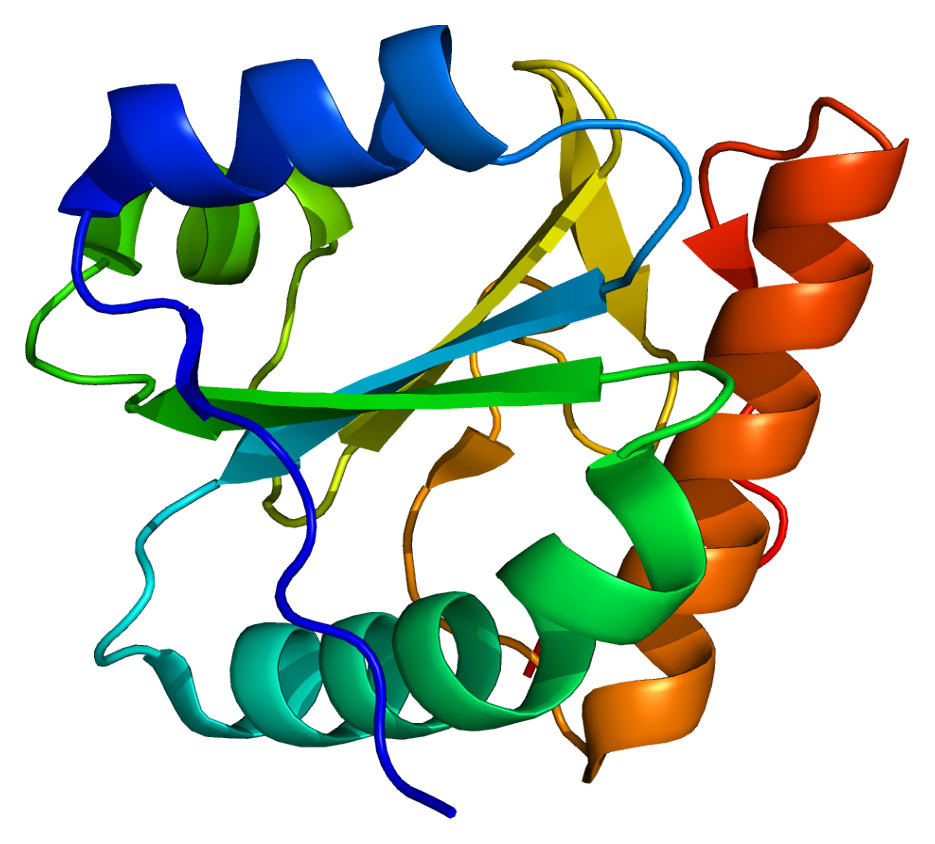
Available structures
PDB	Ortholog search: PDBe RCSB
PDB	List of PDB id codes 1XBS, 3GIX, 4IN0

Identifiers
- Aliases: TXNL4B, DLP, Dim2, thioredoxin like 4B
- External IDs: OMIM: 617722; MGI: 2443724; HomoloGene: 9880; GeneCards: TXNL4B; OMA:TXNL4B - orthologs

Gene location (Human)
Chr.	Chromosome 16 (human)
Band	16q22.2	Start	72,044,289 bp
Band	16q22.2	End	72,094,431 bp

Gene location (Mouse)
Chr.	Chromosome 8 (mouse)
Band	8|8 D3	Start	110,292,524 bp
Band	8|8 D3	End	110,300,683 bp
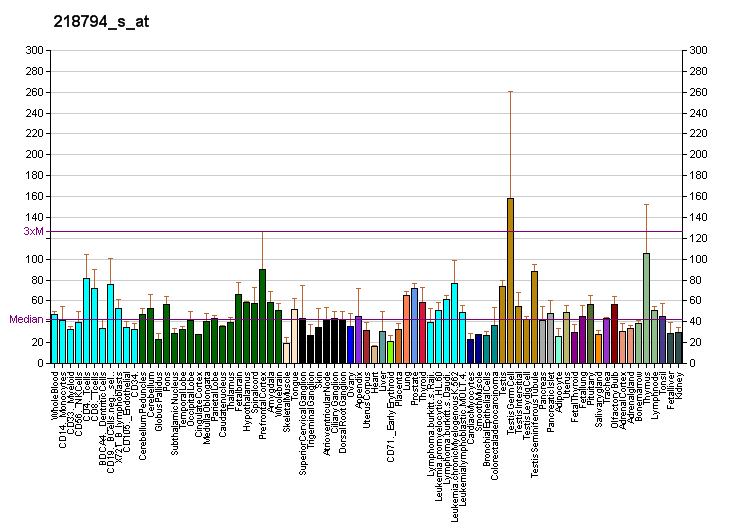
RNA expression pattern
Bgee	Human / Mouse (ortholog); Top expressed in: internal globus pallidus; gonad; monocyte; optic nerve; pancreatic ductal cell; left ovary; right lobe of liver; endothelial cell; secondary oocyte; testicle / Top expressed in: granulocyte; spermatid; spermatocyte; zygote; otolith organ; utricle; seminiferous tubule; secondary oocyte; submandibular gland; embryo; More reference expression data
BioGPS	More reference expression data
Gene ontology
Molecular function	protein binding
Cellular component	U5 snRNP; nucleus; nucleoplasm; cytosol; spliceosomal complex; U4/U6 x U5 tri-snRNP complex
Biological process	mRNA splicing, via spliceosome; cell cycle; mRNA processing; spliceosomal complex assembly; RNA splicing
Sources:Amigo / QuickGO
Orthologs
Species	Human	Mouse
Entrez	54957	234723
Ensembl	ENSG00000140830	ENSMUSG00000031723
UniProt	Q9NX01	Q8BUH1
RefSeq (mRNA)	NM_017853; NM_001142317; NM_001142318; NM_001324354; NM_001324355	NM_175646
RefSeq (protein)	NP_001135789; NP_001135790; NP_001311283; NP_001311284; NP_060323	NP_783577
Location (UCSC)	Chr 16: 72.04 – 72.09 Mb	Chr 8: 110.29 – 110.3 Mb
PubMed search
- Wikidata
View/Edit Human	View/Edit Mouse

Thioredoxin-like protein 4B is a protein that in humans is encoded by the TXNL4B gene.

== Interactions ==
TXNL4B has been shown to interact with PRPF6.
