= RPGRIP1 =

Protein-coding gene in the species Homo sapiens

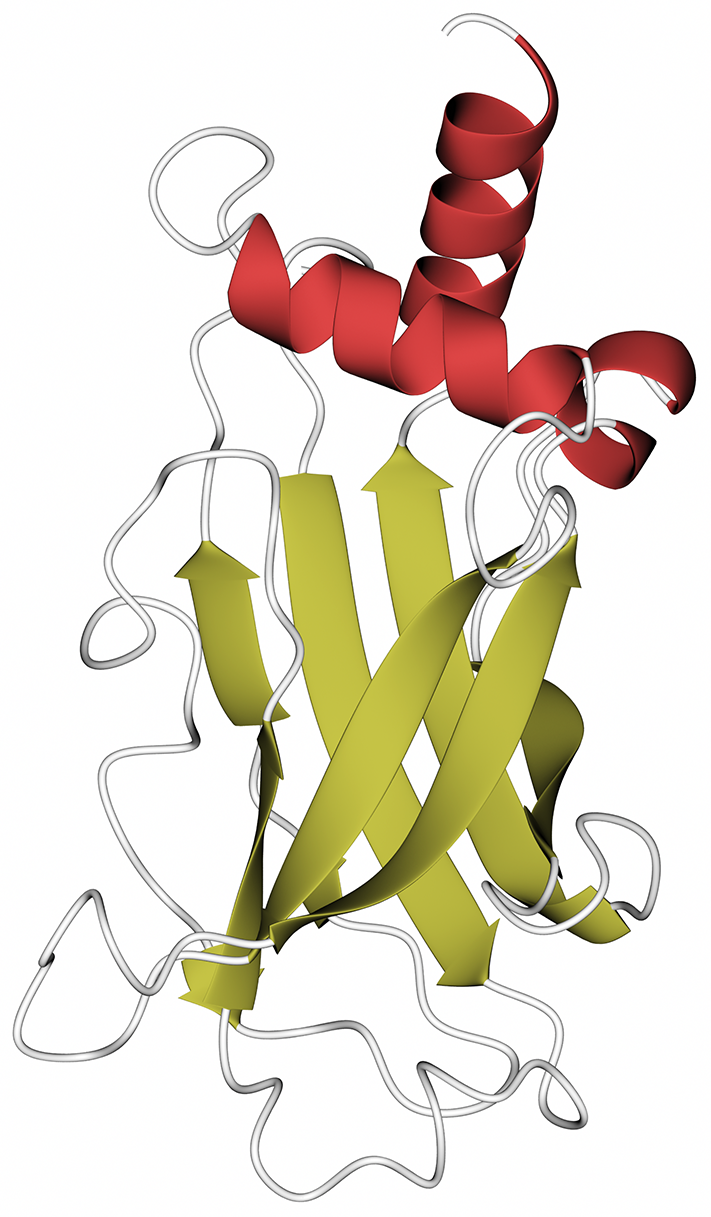
- C2 domain of human RPGRIP1 (PDB code 4qam)

Identifiers
- Aliases: RPGRIP1, CORD13, LCA6, RGI1, RGRIP, RPGRIP, RPGRIP1d, retinitis pigmentosa GTPase regulator interacting protein 1, RPGR interacting protein 1
- External IDs: OMIM: 605446; MGI: 1932134; GeneCards: RPGRIP1
Available structures
PDB	Ortholog search: PDBe RCSB
PDB	List of PDB id codes 4QAM

Gene location (Human)
Chr.	Chromosome 14 (human)
Band	14q11.2	Start	21,280,083 bp
Band	14q11.2	End	21,351,301 bp

Gene location (Mouse)
Chr.	Chromosome 14 (mouse)
Band	14|14 C2	Start	52,110,704 bp
Band	14|14 C2	End	52,163,546 bp
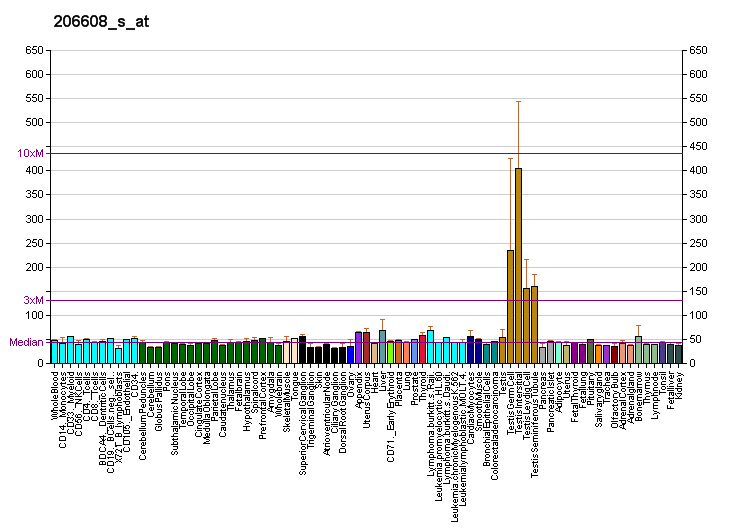
RNA expression pattern
Bgee	Human / Mouse (ortholog); Top expressed in: left testis; sperm; right testis; gonad; testicle; monocyte; granulocyte; blood; right lobe of liver; Achilles tendon / Top expressed in: neural layer of retina; maxillary prominence; mandibular prominence; human fetus; somite; epithelium of lens; dermis; iris; endothelial cell of lymphatic vessel; epithelium of stomach; More reference expression data
BioGPS	More reference expression data
Gene ontology
Molecular function	protein binding
Cellular component	axoneme; cell projection; cilium; photoreceptor connecting cilium; non-motile cilium
Biological process	retina development in camera-type eye; response to stimulus; visual perception; neural precursor cell proliferation; eye photoreceptor cell development
Sources:Amigo / QuickGO
Orthologs
Databases	NCBI: entry; OMA: entry
Species	Human	Mouse
Entrez	57096	77945
Ensembl	ENSG00000092200	ENSMUSG00000057132
UniProt	Q96KN7	Q9EPQ2
RefSeq (mRNA)	NM_020366; NM_001377523; NM_001377948; NM_001377949; NM_001377950 NM_001377951	NM_001168515; NM_023879
RefSeq (protein)	NP_065099; NP_001364452; NP_001364877; NP_001364878; NP_001364879 NP_001364880	NP_001161987; NP_076368
Location (UCSC)	Chr 14: 21.28 – 21.35 Mb	Chr 14: 52.11 – 52.16 Mb
PubMed search
- Wikidata
View/Edit Human	View/Edit Mouse

Identifiers
- Symbol: X-linked retinitis pigmentosa GTPase regulator-interacting protein 1
- Pfam: PF00168
- InterPro: IPR031134
- CATH: 4qam
- SCOP2: 4qam / SCOPe / SUPFAM
Available protein structures:
- PDB: IPR031134 PF00168 (ECOD; PDBsum)
- AlphaFold: IPR031134; PF00168

X-linked retinitis pigmentosa GTPase regulator-interacting protein 1 is a protein in the ciliary transition zone that in humans is encoded by the RPGRIP1 gene. RPGRIP1 is a multi-domain protein containing a coiled-coil domain at the N-terminus, two C2 domains and a C-terminal RPGR-interacting domain (RID). Defects in the gene result in the Leber congenital amaurosis (LCA) syndrome and in the eye disease glaucoma.

== Interactions ==
RPGRIP1 has been shown to interact with Retinitis pigmentosa GTPase regulator. RPGRIP1 interacts with RPGR via its RPGR-interacting domain (RID), which folds into a C2 domain architecture and interacts with RPGR at three different locations: A β strand of the RID interacting with the large loop of RPGR, at a hydrophobic interaction site, and via the N-terminal region of the RID.
