= CRB1 =

Protein-coding gene in humans

Identifiers
- Aliases: CRB1, LCA8, RP12, crumbs 1, cell polarity complex component, crumbs cell polarity complex component 1, CRB1-B, CRB1-C, CRB1-A
- External IDs: OMIM: 604210; MGI: 2136343; GeneCards: CRB1
Available structures
PDB	Ortholog search: PDBe RCSB
PDB	List of PDB id codes 4UU5

Gene location (Human)
Chr.	Chromosome 1 (human)
Band	1q31.3	Start	197,268,204 bp
Band	1q31.3	End	197,478,455 bp

Gene location (Mouse)
Chr.	Chromosome 1 (mouse)
Band	1 E4|1 60.87 cM	Start	139,197,056 bp
Band	1 E4|1 60.87 cM	End	139,377,100 bp
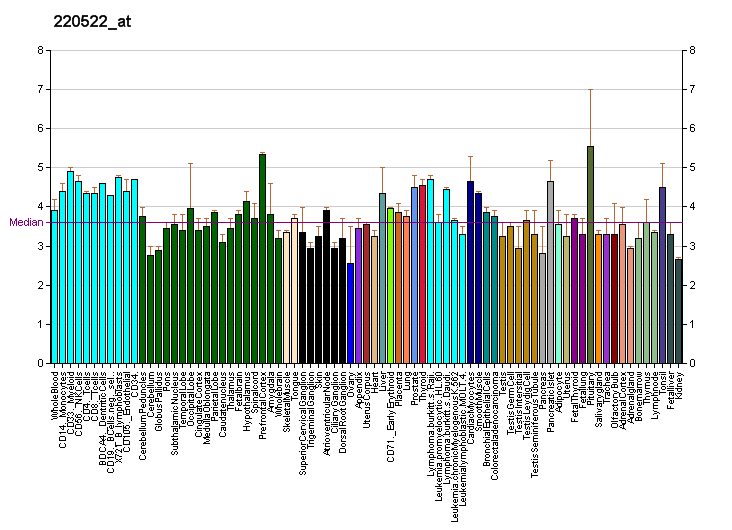
RNA expression pattern
Bgee	Human / Mouse (ortholog); Top expressed in: ganglionic eminence; ventricular zone; endothelial cell; cerebellar hemisphere; right hemisphere of cerebellum; amygdala; caudate nucleus; anterior cingulate cortex; right frontal lobe; nucleus accumbens / Top expressed in: neural layer of retina; retinal pigment epithelium; epithelium of lens; photoreceptor layer of retina; zygote; secondary oocyte; pineal gland; substantia nigra; lumbar subsegment of spinal cord; primary oocyte; More reference expression data
BioGPS	More reference expression data
Gene ontology
Molecular function	calcium ion binding; protein binding
Cellular component	integral component of membrane; extracellular region; microvillus; plasma membrane; apical plasma membrane; membrane; photoreceptor inner segment; protein-containing complex
Biological process	establishment or maintenance of cell polarity; cell-cell signaling; membrane organization; plasma membrane organization; eye photoreceptor cell development; heterophilic cell-cell adhesion via plasma membrane cell adhesion molecules; establishment or maintenance of epithelial cell apical/basal polarity
Sources:Amigo / QuickGO
Orthologs
Databases	NCBI: entry; OMA: entry
Species	Human	Mouse
Entrez	23418	170788
Ensembl	ENSG00000134376	ENSMUSG00000063681
UniProt	P82279	Q8VHS2
RefSeq (mRNA)	NM_001193640; NM_001257965; NM_001257966; NM_012076; NM_201253	NM_133239
RefSeq (protein)	NP_001180569; NP_001244894; NP_001244895; NP_957705	NP_573502
Location (UCSC)	Chr 1: 197.27 – 197.48 Mb	Chr 1: 139.2 – 139.38 Mb
PubMed search
- Wikidata
View/Edit Human	View/Edit Mouse

Crumbs homolog 1 is a protein that in humans is encoded by the CRB1 gene.

This gene encodes a protein which is similar to the Drosophila crumbs protein and localizes to the inner segment of mammalian photoreceptors. In Drosophila, crumbs localizes to the stalk of the fly photoreceptor and may be a component of the molecular scaffold that controls proper development of polarity in the eye. Mutations in this gene are associated with a severe form of retinitis pigmentosa, RP12, and with Leber congenital amaurosis. Alternatively spliced transcript variants have been observed but their full-length nature has yet to be determined. One small study suggests that mutations in this gene are associated with keratoconus in patients that already have Leber's congenital amaurosis.
