= CRX (gene) =

Protein-coding gene in the species Homo sapiens

Identifiers
- Aliases: CRX, CORD2, CRD, LCA7, OTX3, cone-rod homeobox
- External IDs: OMIM: 602225; MGI: 1194883; GeneCards: CRX

Gene location (Human)
Chr.	Chromosome 19 (human)
Band	19q13.33	Start	47,819,779 bp
Band	19q13.33	End	47,843,330 bp

Gene location (Mouse)
Chr.	Chromosome 7 (mouse)
Band	7 A2|7 8.6 cM	Start	15,599,872 bp
Band	7 A2|7 8.6 cM	End	15,613,893 bp
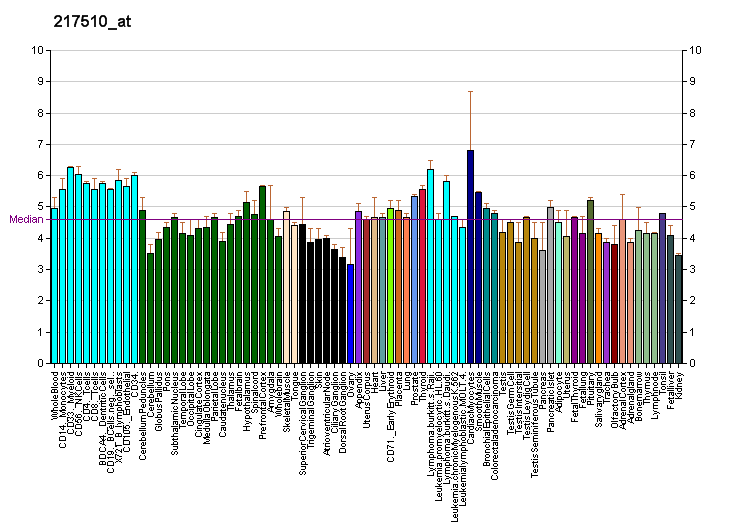
RNA expression pattern
Bgee	Human / Mouse (ortholog); Top expressed in: retinal pigment epithelium; gonad; testicle; Epithelium of choroid plexus; right lobe of liver; granulocyte; monocyte; upper respiratory tract; gallbladder; mucosa of nose / Top expressed in: neural layer of retina; outer nuclear layer; inner nuclear layer; pineal gland; epithelium of lens; retinal pigment epithelium; photoreceptor layer of retina; Ileal epithelium; lumbar spinal ganglion; corneal stroma; More reference expression data
BioGPS	More reference expression data
Gene ontology
Molecular function	DNA-binding transcription activator activity, RNA polymerase II-specific; DNA binding; leucine zipper domain binding; protein binding; sequence-specific DNA binding; RNA polymerase II cis-regulatory region sequence-specific DNA binding; DNA-binding transcription factor activity; DNA-binding transcription factor activity, RNA polymerase II-specific
Cellular component	nucleus
Biological process	circadian rhythm; nervous system development; animal organ morphogenesis; positive regulation of transcription by RNA polymerase II; response to stimulus; positive regulation of photoreceptor cell differentiation; transcription, DNA-templated; multicellular organism development; cell differentiation; regulation of transcription, DNA-templated; visual perception; transcription by RNA polymerase II
Sources:Amigo / QuickGO
Orthologs
Databases	NCBI: entry; OMA: entry
Species	Human	Mouse
Entrez	1406	12951
Ensembl	ENSG00000105392	ENSMUSG00000041578
UniProt	O43186	O54751
RefSeq (mRNA)	NM_000554	NM_001113330; NM_007770
RefSeq (protein)	NP_000545	NP_001106801; NP_031796
Location (UCSC)	Chr 19: 47.82 – 47.84 Mb	Chr 7: 15.6 – 15.61 Mb
PubMed search
- Wikidata
View/Edit Human	View/Edit Mouse

Cone-rod homeobox protein is a protein that in humans is encoded by the CRX gene.

== Function ==
The protein encoded by this gene is a photoreceptor-specific transcription factor which plays a role in the differentiation of photoreceptor cells. This homeodomain protein is necessary for the maintenance of normal cone and rod function. Mutations in this gene are associated with photoreceptor degeneration, Leber's congenital amaurosis type III and the autosomal dominant cone-rod dystrophy 2. Several alternatively spliced transcript variants of this gene have been described, but the full-length nature of some variants has not been determined.

Mammalian CRX encodes a 299 amino acid protein containing a DNA binding homeodomain (HD) near its N-terminus followed by glutamine rich (Gln), and basic amino acid regions, then a C-terminal transactivation domain (AD). While structural biochemistry has demonstrated that the CRX HD adopts a canonical homeodomain protein fold, the AD is predicted to be flexible and disordered. The structural attributes of the CRX AD have yet to be solved.

== Evolution ==
CRX is a divergent duplicate of OTX produced during the 2 rounds of vertebrate whole genome duplication.

In the eutherian mammals, CRX has again duplicated by tandem gene duplication, with six ancestral duplicates, which are collectively referred to as ETCHbox genes.
