= PDE6D =

Protein-coding gene in the species Homo sapiens

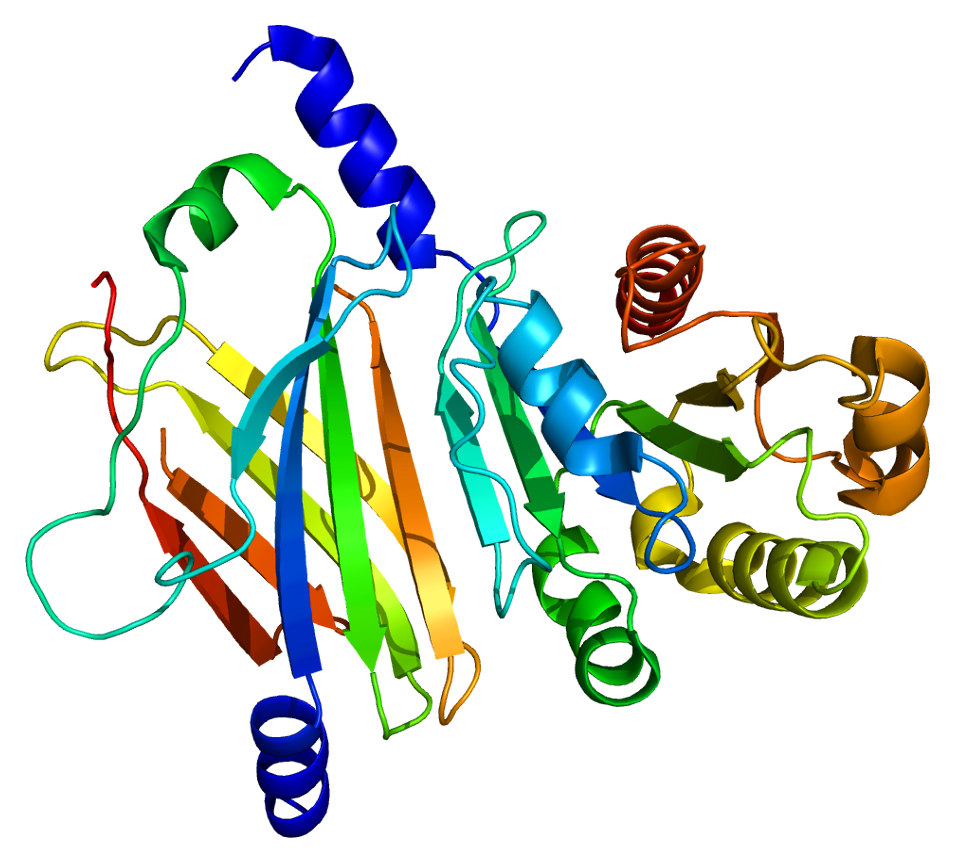
Available structures
PDB	Ortholog search: PDBe RCSB
PDB	List of PDB id codes 1KSG, 1KSH, 1KSJ, 3T5G, 3T5I, 4JHP, 4JV6, 4JV8, 4JVB, 4JVF, 5E8F, 5E80, 5F2U

Identifiers
- Aliases: PDE6D, JBTS22, PDED, phosphodiesterase 6D
- External IDs: OMIM: 602676; MGI: 1270843; HomoloGene: 1954; GeneCards: PDE6D; OMA:PDE6D - orthologs
- EC number: 3.1.4.35

Gene location (Human)
Chr.	Chromosome 2 (human)
Band	2q37.1	Start	231,732,433 bp
Band	2q37.1	End	231,786,272 bp

Gene location (Mouse)
Chr.	Chromosome 1 (mouse)
Band	1|1 C5	Start	86,470,716 bp
Band	1|1 C5	End	86,510,351 bp
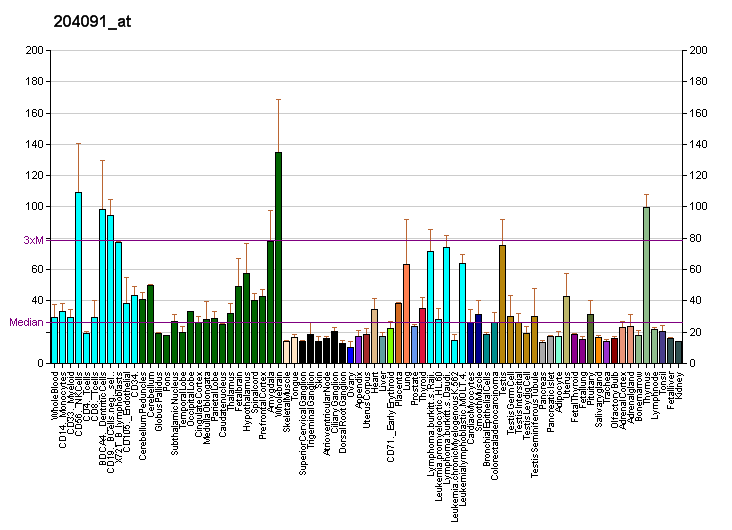
RNA expression pattern
Bgee	Human / Mouse (ortholog); Top expressed in: left testis; right testis; C1 segment; ventricular zone; ganglionic eminence; caudate nucleus; amygdala; putamen; prefrontal cortex; cingulate gyrus / Top expressed in: neural layer of retina; olfactory epithelium; zygote; tail of embryo; primary oocyte; medial ganglionic eminence; seminiferous tubule; sternocleidomastoid muscle; genital tubercle; endocardial cushion; More reference expression data
BioGPS	More reference expression data
Gene ontology
Molecular function	GTPase inhibitor activity; protein binding; 3',5'-cyclic-nucleotide phosphodiesterase activity
Cellular component	cytoplasm; cytosol; cell projection; cytoskeleton; cytoplasmic vesicle membrane; membrane; cytoplasmic vesicle; cilium
Biological process	negative regulation of GTPase activity; response to stimulus; visual perception; sensory perception of light stimulus
Sources:Amigo / QuickGO
Orthologs
Species	Human	Mouse
Entrez	5147	18582
Ensembl	ENSG00000156973	ENSMUSG00000026239
UniProt	O43924; Q6IB24	O55057
RefSeq (mRNA)	NM_001291018; NM_002601	NM_008801; NM_001360816; NM_001360817
RefSeq (protein)	NP_001277947; NP_002592; NP_002592.1	NP_032827; NP_001347745; NP_001347746
Location (UCSC)	Chr 2: 231.73 – 231.79 Mb	Chr 1: 86.47 – 86.51 Mb
PubMed search
- Wikidata
View/Edit Human	View/Edit Mouse

Retinal rod rhodopsin-sensitive cGMP 3',5'-cyclic phosphodiesterase subunit delta is an enzyme that in humans is encoded by the PDE6D gene. PDE6D was originally identified as a fourth subunit of rod cell-specific cGMP phosphodiesterase (PDE) (EC 3.1.4.35). The precise function of PDE delta subunit in the rod specific GMP-PDE complex is unclear. In addition, PDE delta subunit is not confined to photoreceptor cells but is widely distributed in different tissues. PDE delta subunit is thought to be a specific soluble transport factor for certain prenylated proteins and Arl2-GTP a regulator of PDE-mediated transport.

== Interactions ==
PDE6D has been shown to interact with:

- ARL2
- HRAS
- RAP1A
- Retinitis pigmentosa GTPase regulator
- Rnd1
