= Theodor Leber =

German ophthalmologist (1840–1917)

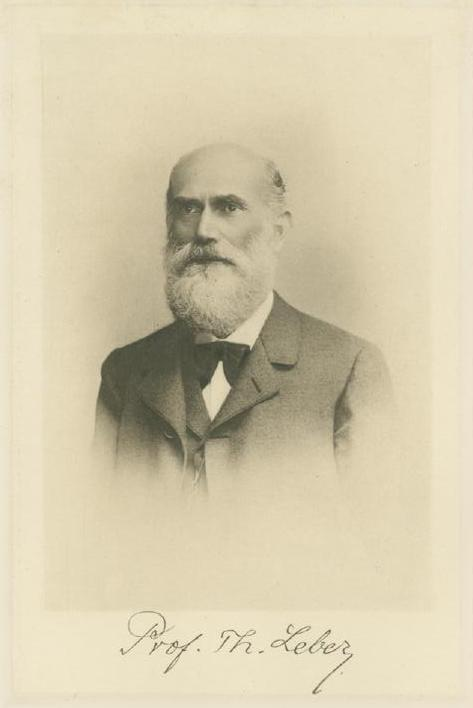
Theodor Leber (1840-1917)

Theodor Karl Gustav von Leber (29 February 1840 – 17 April 1917) was a German ophthalmologist from Karlsruhe.

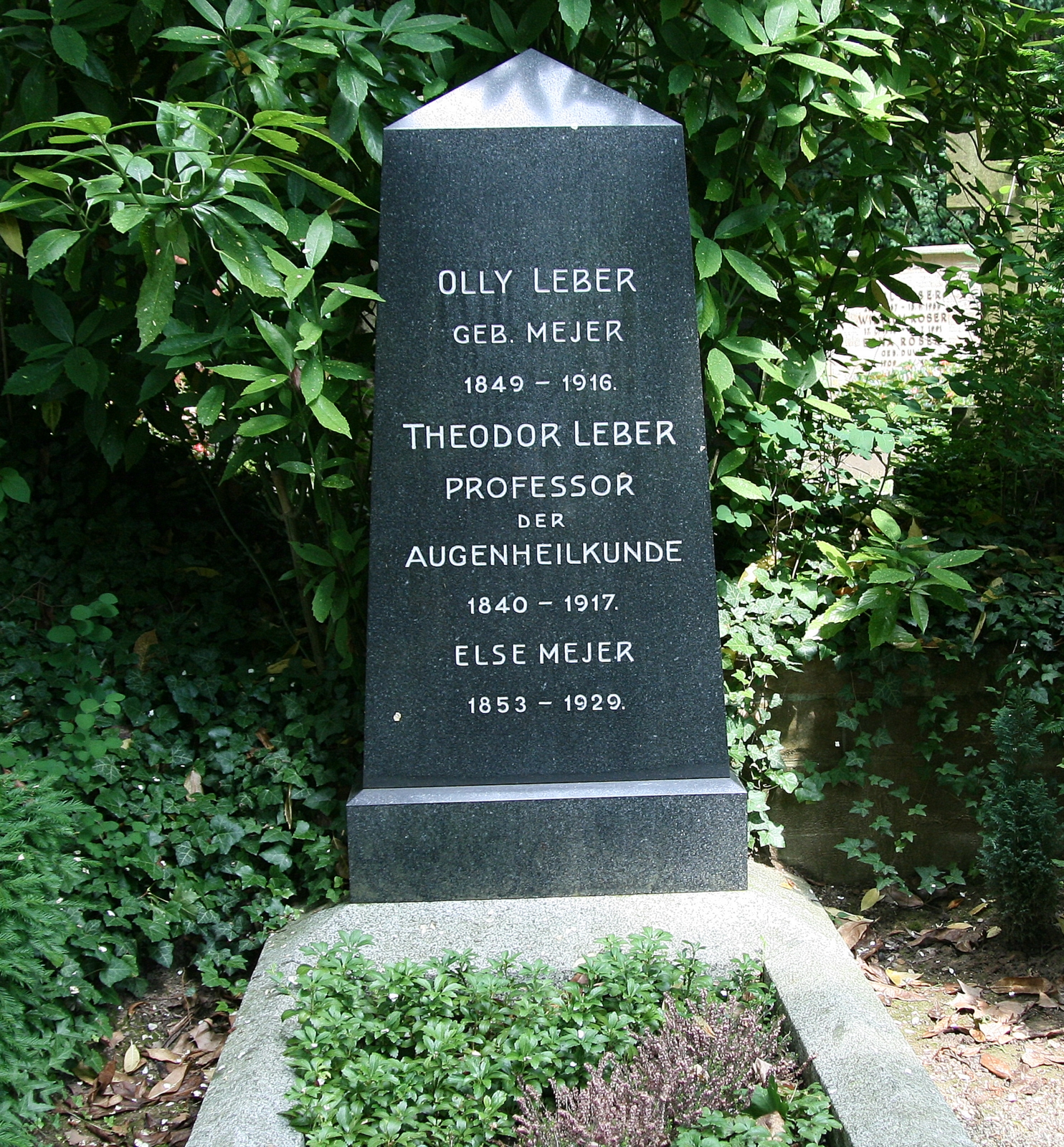
Grave in Heidelberg

Leber was a student of Hermann von Helmholtz (1821-1894) in Heidelberg, where he received his doctorate in 1862. He remained in Heidelberg as an assistant to Hermann Jakob Knapp (1832-1911) at the Heidelberg eye clinic, afterwards studying physiology under Carl Ludwig (1816-1895) in Vienna. From 1867 until 1870 he was an assistant to ophthalmologist Albrecht von Graefe (1828-1870) in Berlin. In 1871, he became director of the university eye clinic in Göttingen, and from 1890 to 1910 was director of the eye clinic in Heidelberg.

Leber was the first to describe what is now known as Leber's congenital amaurosis in 1869 and Leber's hereditary optic neuropathy in 1871. An anatomical structure called "Leber's plexus" is named after him, which is a small venous plexus in the eye located between Schlemm's canal (named after German anatomist Friedrich Schlemm) and Fontana's spaces (named after Italian physicist Felice Fontana).

A scholarship given by the German Ophthalmological Society is named after Leber, and is called the Theodor-Leber-Stipendium zur Förderung der pharmakologischen und pharmakophysiologischen Forschung in der Augenheilkunde.
