= LCA5 =

Protein-coding gene in the species Homo sapiens

Identifiers
- Aliases: LCA5, C6orf152, Leber congenital amaurosis 5, lebercilin, lebercilin LCA5
- External IDs: OMIM: 611408; MGI: 1923032; HomoloGene: 32718; GeneCards: LCA5; OMA:LCA5 - orthologs

Gene location (Human)
Chr.	Chromosome 6 (human)
Band	6q14.1	Start	79,484,991 bp
Band	6q14.1	End	79,537,458 bp

Gene location (Mouse)
Chr.	Chromosome 9 (mouse)
Band	9|9 E2	Start	83,272,346 bp
Band	9|9 E2	End	83,323,180 bp
RNA expression pattern
Bgee	Human / Mouse (ortholog); Top expressed in: mucosa of paranasal sinus; bronchial epithelial cell; caput epididymis; testicle; Achilles tendon; secondary oocyte; right uterine tube; ventricular zone; ganglionic eminence; gonad / Top expressed in: superior cervical ganglion; neural layer of retina; hand; spermatid; tail of embryo; genital tubercle; spermatocyte; zygote; trigeminal ganglion; retinal pigment epithelium; More reference expression data
BioGPS	n/a
Gene ontology
Molecular function	protein binding; protein-containing complex binding
Cellular component	cytoplasm; cell projection; cilium; cytoskeleton; microtubule organizing center; axoneme; photoreceptor connecting cilium; ciliary basal body
Biological process	protein transport; intraciliary transport; photoreceptor cell maintenance
Sources:Amigo / QuickGO
Orthologs
Species	Human	Mouse
Entrez	167691	75782
Ensembl	ENSG00000135338	ENSMUSG00000032258
UniProt	Q86VQ0	Q80ST9
RefSeq (mRNA)	NM_001122769; NM_181714	NM_027448; NM_029434
RefSeq (protein)	NP_001116241; NP_859065	NP_081724; NP_083710
Location (UCSC)	Chr 6: 79.48 – 79.54 Mb	Chr 9: 83.27 – 83.32 Mb
PubMed search
- Wikidata
View/Edit Human	View/Edit Mouse

Lebercilin, also known as leber congenital amaurosis 5 (LCA5), is a protein that in humans is encoded by the LCA5 gene. This protein is thought to be involved in centrosomal or ciliary functions.

== Clinical significance ==
Mutations in the LCA5 gene are associated with Leber's congenital amaurosis.
