= Retinitis pigmentosa GTPase regulator =

Protein found in humans

RPGR

Identifiers
- Aliases: RPGR, COD1, CORDX1, CRD, PCDX, RP15, RP3, XLRP3, orf15, Retinitis pigmentosa GTPase regulator
- External IDs: OMIM: 312610; MGI: 1344037; GeneCards: RPGR
Available structures
PDB	Ortholog search: PDBe RCSB
PDB	List of PDB id codes 4JHN, 4JHP, 4QAM

Gene location (Human)
Chr.	X chromosome (human)
Band	Xp11.4	Start	38,269,163 bp
Band	Xp11.4	End	38,327,564 bp

Gene location (Mouse)
Chr.	X chromosome (mouse)
Band	X|X A1.1	Start	9,939,860 bp
Band	X|X A1.1	End	10,083,159 bp
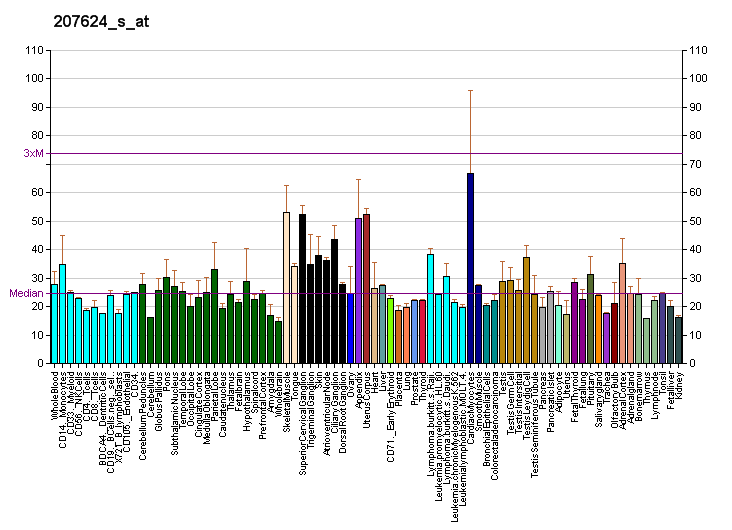
RNA expression pattern
Bgee	Human / Mouse (ortholog); Top expressed in: sperm; bronchial epithelial cell; right uterine tube; right lung; anterior pituitary; mucosa of paranasal sinus; tibial nerve; subcutaneous adipose tissue; Epithelium of choroid plexus; upper lobe of left lung / Top expressed in: saccule; medial ganglionic eminence; otic placode; nucleus accumbens; otic vesicle; olfactory epithelium; dorsal striatum; superior cervical ganglion; substantia nigra; spermatid; More reference expression data
BioGPS	More reference expression data
Gene ontology
Molecular function	protein binding; guanyl-nucleotide exchange factor activity; RNA binding
Cellular component	cytoplasm; ciliary basal body; centrosome; photoreceptor outer segment; cell projection; sperm flagellum; cilium; cytoskeleton; microtubule organizing center; Golgi apparatus; motile cilium
Biological process	intracellular protein transport; cell projection organization; response to stimulus; visual perception; intraciliary transport; cilium assembly; regulation of molecular function
Sources:Amigo / QuickGO
Orthologs
Databases	NCBI: entry; OMA: entry
Species	Human	Mouse
Entrez	6103	19893
Ensembl	ENSG00000156313	ENSMUSG00000031174
UniProt	Q92834	Q9R0X5
RefSeq (mRNA)	NM_000328; NM_001023582; NM_001034853	NM_001177950; NM_001177951; NM_001177952; NM_001177953; NM_001177954 NM_011285
RefSeq (protein)	NP_000319; NP_001030025; NP_001354174; NP_001354175; NP_001354176 NP_001354177; NP_001354178; NP_001354179; NP_001354180	NP_001171421; NP_001171422; NP_001171423; NP_001171424; NP_001171425 NP_035415
Location (UCSC)	Chr X: 38.27 – 38.33 Mb	Chr X: 9.94 – 10.08 Mb
PubMed search
- Wikidata
View/Edit Human	View/Edit Mouse

X-linked retinitis pigmentosa GTPase regulator is a GTPase-binding protein that in humans is encoded by the RPGR gene. The gene is located on the X-chromosome and is commonly associated with X-linked retinitis pigmentosa (XLRP). In photoreceptor cells, RPGR is localized in the connecting cilium which connects the protein-synthesizing inner segment to the photosensitive outer segment and is involved in the modulation of cargo trafficked between the two segments.

== Function ==
This gene encodes a protein with a series of six RCC1-like domains (RLDs), characteristic of the highly conserved guanine nucleotide exchange factors. Mutations in this gene have been associated with X-linked retinitis pigmentosa (XLRP). Multiple alternatively spliced transcript variants that encode different isoforms of this gene have been reported, but the full-length natures of only some have been determined.

The two major isoforms are RPGR^{const}, the default isoform, composed of exons 1-19, and RPGR^{ORF15} which retains part of intron 15 as the terminal exon. ORF15 is the terminal exon of RPGR^{ORF15} and is a mutational hotspot accounting for ~60% of RPGR patients with heterogeneous diseases ranging from XLRP to cone-rod degeneration and macular degeneration. Alternatively, the RPGR^{const} isoform contains a putative prenylation domain on its C-terminal end which is involved in posttranslational modification and allows membrane-association and protein trafficking. The C-terminal domain of the RPGR^{const} isoform contains a CTIL motif (812CTIL815) which recruits prenyl-binding protein PDE6D which then shuttles the protein to the connecting cilium.

Photoreceptor cells contain an inner segment and an outer segment which are joined by a connecting cilium. Protein synthesis occurs exclusively in the inner segment and all proteins must be trafficked across the connecting cilium to the outer segment where the phototransduction cascade takes place. RPGR is primarily located in a protein complex in the connecting cilium and is involved in regulating the cargo that is trafficked from the inner segment to the outer segment.

== Interactions ==
Retinitis pigmentosa GTPase regulator has been shown to interact with PDE6D nephronophthisis (NPHP) proteins and RPGRIP1. Binding to PDE6D has been shown to ensure ciliary localization of the RPGR^{const} isoform. Additionally, the N-terminal of interacts with a PDE6D interacting protein, INPP5E (inositol polyphosphatase 5E). INPP5E has been shown to regulates phosphoinositide metabolism and may modulate the phosphoinositide content of photoreceptor cells.

RPGR has also been shown to preferentially interact with the GDP-bound form of the small GTPase RAB8A. RAB8A is involved in rhodopsin trafficking in primary cilia. The C-terminal domain of RPGR^{ORF15} has been shown to interact with whirlin, a ciliary protein that is mutated in Usher Syndrome. The RPGR^{ORF15} isoform has been shown to be glutamylated on its C-terminus by tubulin-tyrosine ligase-like 5 (TTLL5). It has also been shown that loss of TTLL5 mimics loss of RPGR in the mouse retina.

== See also ==
- X-linked cone-rod dystrophy, type 1
