= PRPF3 =

Protein-coding gene in humans

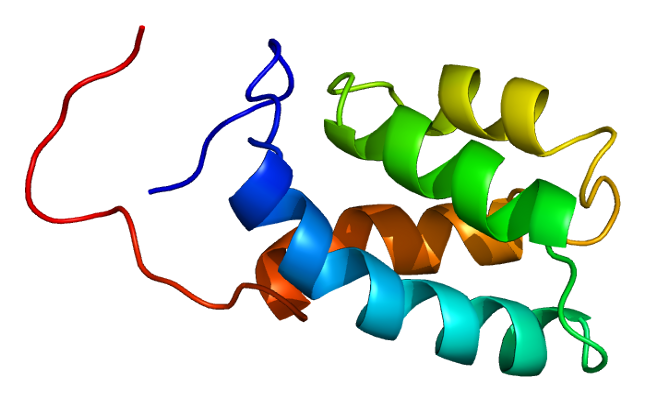

Identifiers
- Aliases: PRPF3, pre-mRNA processing factor 3, HPRP3, HPRP3P, PRP3, Prp3p, RP18, SNRNP90
- External IDs: OMIM: 607301; MGI: 1918017; GeneCards: PRPF3
Available structures
PDB	Ortholog search: PDBe RCSB
PDB	List of PDB id codes 1X4Q, 3JCR

Gene location (Human)
Chr.	Chromosome 1 (human)
Band	1q21.2	Start	150,321,479 bp
Band	1q21.2	End	150,353,233 bp

Gene location (Mouse)
Chr.	Chromosome 3 (mouse)
Band	3|3 F2.1	Start	95,737,436 bp
Band	3|3 F2.1	End	95,763,197 bp
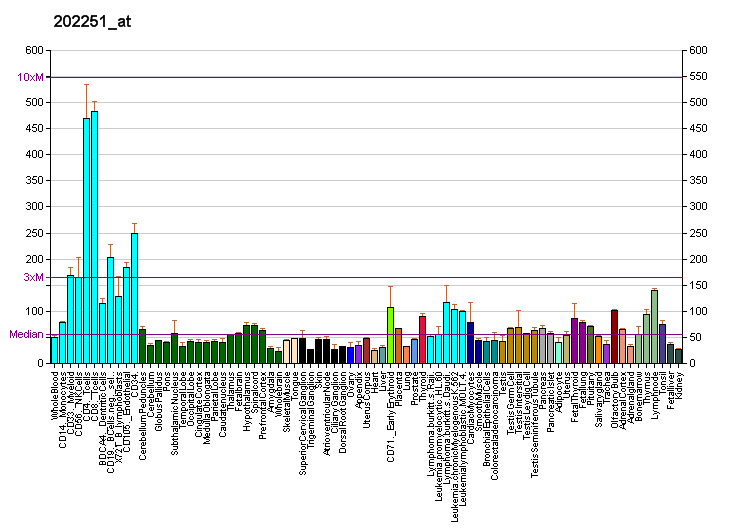
RNA expression pattern
Bgee	Human / Mouse (ortholog); Top expressed in: sural nerve; right uterine tube; left ovary; right ovary; left lobe of thyroid gland; right lobe of thyroid gland; anterior pituitary; cerebellar hemisphere; right hemisphere of cerebellum; body of uterus / Top expressed in: tail of embryo; genital tubercle; primitive streak; ventricular zone; epiblast; neural layer of retina; otic vesicle; yolk sac; otic placode; primary oocyte; More reference expression data
BioGPS	More reference expression data
Gene ontology
Molecular function	protein binding; identical protein binding; RNA binding
Cellular component	Cajal body; U4/U6 x U5 tri-snRNP complex; spliceosomal complex; nucleus; nucleoplasm; cytosol; nuclear speck; protein-containing complex; U2-type precatalytic spliceosome
Biological process	RNA splicing, via transesterification reactions; mRNA splicing, via spliceosome; mRNA processing; spliceosomal tri-snRNP complex assembly; RNA splicing
Sources:Amigo / QuickGO
Orthologs
Databases	NCBI: entry; OMA: entry
Species	Human	Mouse
Entrez	9129	70767
Ensembl	ENSG00000117360	ENSMUSG00000015748
UniProt	O43395	Q922U1
RefSeq (mRNA)	NM_004698; NM_001350529	NM_027541; NM_001316751
RefSeq (protein)	NP_004689; NP_001337458	NP_001303680; NP_081817
Location (UCSC)	Chr 1: 150.32 – 150.35 Mb	Chr 3: 95.74 – 95.76 Mb
PubMed search
- Wikidata
View/Edit Human	View/Edit Mouse

U4/U6 small nuclear ribonucleoprotein Prp3 is a protein that in humans is encoded by the PRPF3 gene.

== Function ==
The removal of introns from nuclear pre-mRNAs occurs on complexes called spliceosomes, which are made up of 4 small nuclear ribonucleoprotein (snRNP) particles and an undefined number of transiently associated splicing factors. PRPF3 is one of several proteins that associate with U4 and U6 snRNPs.[supplied by OMIM]

== Interactions ==
PRPF3 has been shown to interact with DVL3.
