= GUCY2F =

Protein-coding gene in humans

Identifiers
- Aliases: GUCY2F, CYGF, GC-F, GUC2DL, GUC2F, RETGC-2, ROS-GC2, guanylate cyclase 2F, retinal
- External IDs: OMIM: 300041; MGI: 105119; HomoloGene: 37491; GeneCards: GUCY2F; OMA:GUCY2F - orthologs

Gene location (Human)
Chr.	X chromosome (human)
Band	Xq22.3-q23	Start	109,372,906 bp
Band	Xq22.3-q23	End	109,482,086 bp

Gene location (Mouse)
Chr.	X chromosome (mouse)
Band	X F2|X 62.85 cM	Start	140,864,156 bp
Band	X F2|X 62.85 cM	End	140,979,927 bp
RNA expression pattern
Bgee	Human / Mouse (ortholog); Top expressed in: testicle; right uterine tube; olfactory zone of nasal mucosa; endometrium; canal of the cervix; connective tissue; adipose tissue; body of uterus; viscus; abdomen / Top expressed in: layer of retina; neural layer of retina; ear; vestibular labyrinth; outer nuclear layer; olfactory bulb; diencephalon; Hypothalamus; Cortex of frontal lobe; hippocampal formation; More reference expression data
BioGPS	n/a
Gene ontology
Molecular function	protein kinase activity; nucleotide binding; protein homodimerization activity; GTP binding; lyase activity; phosphorus-oxygen lyase activity; ATP binding; guanylate cyclase activity; signaling receptor activity; adenylate cyclase activity; protein heterodimerization activity; peptide receptor activity
Cellular component	integral component of membrane; membrane; integral component of plasma membrane; photoreceptor disc membrane; guanylate cyclase complex, soluble; nuclear outer membrane; plasma membrane
Biological process	intracellular signal transduction; response to stimulus; regulation of rhodopsin mediated signaling pathway; cyclic nucleotide biosynthetic process; detection of light stimulus involved in visual perception; protein phosphorylation; visual perception; receptor guanylyl cyclase signaling pathway; cGMP biosynthetic process; cGMP-mediated signaling; signal transduction
Sources:Amigo / QuickGO
Orthologs
Species	Human	Mouse
Entrez	2986	245650
Ensembl	ENSG00000101890	ENSMUSG00000042282
UniProt	P51841	Q5SDA5
RefSeq (mRNA)	NM_001522	NM_001007576
RefSeq (protein)	NP_001513	NP_001007577
Location (UCSC)	Chr X: 109.37 – 109.48 Mb	Chr X: 140.86 – 140.98 Mb
PubMed search
- Wikidata
View/Edit Human	View/Edit Mouse

Retinal guanylyl cyclase 2 also known as guanylate cyclase F (GUCY2F) is a protein that in humans is encoded by the GUCY2F gene.

== Function ==
The protein encoded by this gene is a guanylyl cyclase found predominantly in photoreceptors in the retina. The encoded protein is thought to be involved in resynthesis of cGMP after light activation of the visual signal transduction cascade, allowing a return to the dark state. This protein is a single-pass type I membrane protein.

== Clinical significance ==
Defects in this gene may be a cause of X-linked retinitis pigmentosa.
