= OTX1 =

Protein-coding gene in the species Homo sapiens

Identifiers
- Aliases: OTX1, orthodenticle homeobox 1
- External IDs: OMIM: 600036; MGI: 97450; GeneCards: OTX1

Gene location (Human)
Chr.	Chromosome 2 (human)
Band	2p15	Start	63,050,057 bp
Band	2p15	End	63,057,836 bp

Gene location (Mouse)
Chr.	Chromosome 11 (mouse)
Band	11 A3.2|11 14.1 cM	Start	21,944,764 bp
Band	11 A3.2|11 14.1 cM	End	21,952,897 bp
RNA expression pattern
Bgee	Human / Mouse (ortholog); Top expressed in: olfactory zone of nasal mucosa; ventricular zone; ganglionic eminence; minor salivary glands; skin of leg; skin of abdomen; testicle; nasal epithelium; amygdala; cingulate gyrus / Top expressed in: nasolacrimal duct; lip; ventricular zone; lacrimal gland; optic nerve; ciliary body; iris; zygote; thyroglossal duct; vestibular membrane of cochlear duct; More reference expression data
BioGPS	n/a
Gene ontology
Molecular function	DNA-binding transcription factor activity; RNA polymerase II cis-regulatory region sequence-specific DNA binding; DNA binding; sequence-specific DNA binding; DNA-binding transcription activator activity, RNA polymerase II-specific; protein binding; DNA-binding transcription factor activity, RNA polymerase II-specific
Cellular component	nucleus
Biological process	diencephalon morphogenesis; regulation of transcription by RNA polymerase II; multicellular organism development; metencephalon development; forebrain development; regulation of transcription, DNA-templated; inner ear morphogenesis; midbrain development; anterior/posterior pattern specification; positive regulation of transcription by RNA polymerase II; transcription by RNA polymerase II
Sources:Amigo / QuickGO
Orthologs
Databases	NCBI: entry; OMA: entry
Species	Human	Mouse
Entrez	5013	18423
Ensembl	ENSG00000115507	ENSMUSG00000005917
UniProt	P32242	P80205
RefSeq (mRNA)	NM_001199770; NM_014562	NM_011023
RefSeq (protein)	NP_001186699; NP_055377	NP_035153
Location (UCSC)	Chr 2: 63.05 – 63.06 Mb	Chr 11: 21.94 – 21.95 Mb
PubMed search
- Wikidata
View/Edit Human	View/Edit Mouse

Homeobox protein OTX1 is a protein that in humans is encoded by the OTX1 gene.

== Function ==
This gene encodes a member of the bicoid sub-family of homeodomain-containing transcription factors. The encoded protein acts as a transcription factor and may play a role in brain and sensory organ development. The Otx gene is active in the region of the first gill arch, which is related to the upper and lower jaw and two of the bones of the ear. A similar protein in mice is required for proper brain and sensory organ development and can cause epilepsy.
