= TULP1 =

Protein-coding gene in the species Homo sapiens

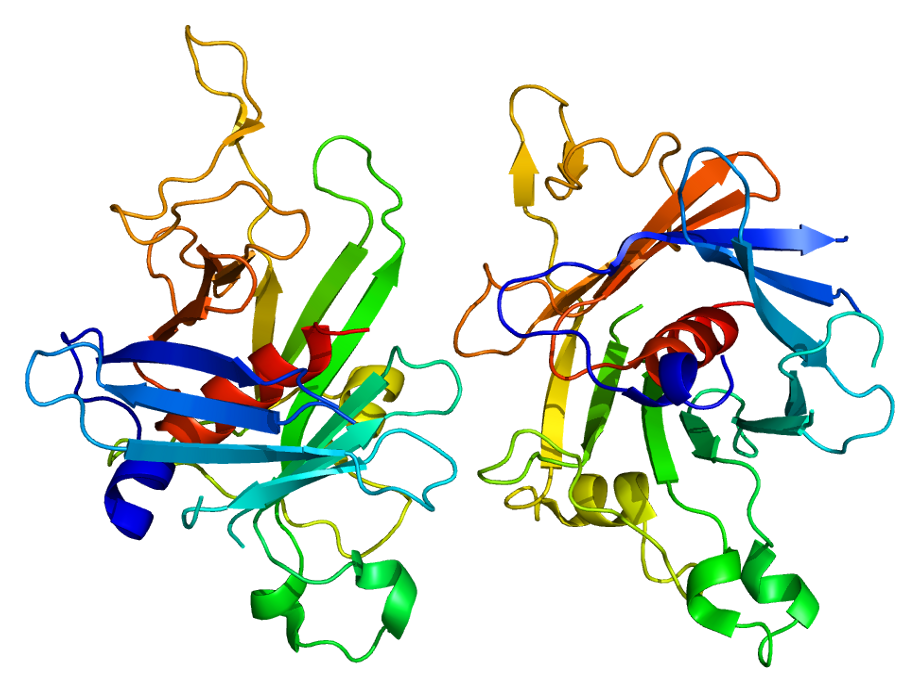
Available structures
PDB	Ortholog search: PDBe RCSB
PDB	List of PDB id codes 2FIM, 3C5N

Identifiers
- Aliases: TULP1, LCA15, RP14, TUBL1, tubby like protein 1, TUB like protein 1
- External IDs: OMIM: 602280; MGI: 109571; HomoloGene: 2491; GeneCards: TULP1; OMA:TULP1 - orthologs

Gene location (Human)
Chr.	Chromosome 6 (human)
Band	6p21.31	Start	35,497,874 bp
Band	6p21.31	End	35,512,896 bp

Gene location (Mouse)
Chr.	Chromosome 17 (mouse)
Band	17|17 A3.3	Start	28,570,489 bp
Band	17|17 A3.3	End	28,584,196 bp
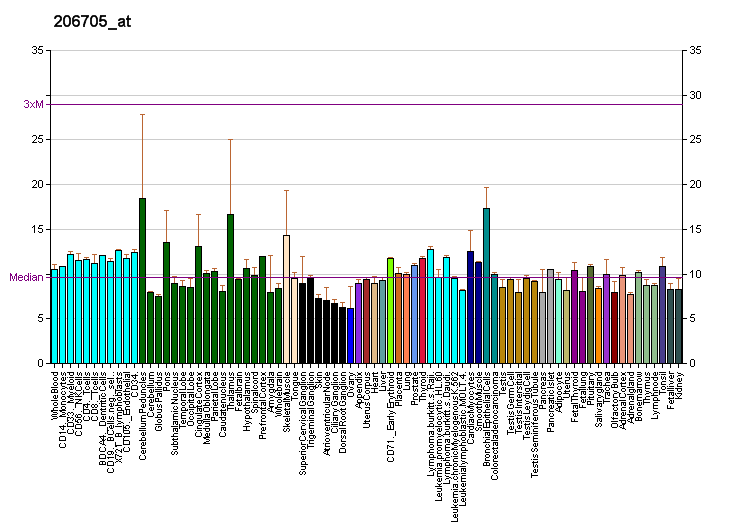
RNA expression pattern
Bgee	Human / Mouse (ortholog); Top expressed in: gonad; retinal pigment epithelium; sural nerve; ventricular zone; left uterine tube; body of uterus; vagina; ectocervix; skin of leg; prostate / Top expressed in: neural layer of retina; retinal pigment epithelium; pineal gland; epithelium of lens; parotid gland; submandibular gland; corneal stroma; otic vesicle; lacrimal gland; left lung lobe; More reference expression data
BioGPS	More reference expression data
Gene ontology
Molecular function	protein binding; phosphatidylinositol-4,5-bisphosphate binding; actin filament binding; phosphatidylinositol binding
Cellular component	cytoplasm; axon terminus; cytosol; cell projection; membrane; photoreceptor inner segment; plasma membrane; photoreceptor outer segment; synapse; cilium; extracellular region; cell junction
Biological process	positive regulation of phagocytosis; response to stimulus; dendrite development; protein localization to photoreceptor outer segment; detection of light stimulus involved in visual perception; receptor localization to non-motile cilium; retina homeostasis; retina development in camera-type eye; eye photoreceptor cell development; phagocytosis; phagocytosis, recognition; photoreceptor cell maintenance; vesicle-mediated transport; visual perception; protein localization to cilium
Sources:Amigo / QuickGO
Orthologs
Species	Human	Mouse
Entrez	7287	22157
Ensembl	ENSG00000112041	ENSMUSG00000037446
UniProt	O00294	Q9Z273
RefSeq (mRNA)	NM_003322; NM_001289395	NM_021478
RefSeq (protein)	NP_001276324; NP_003313	NP_067453
Location (UCSC)	Chr 6: 35.5 – 35.51 Mb	Chr 17: 28.57 – 28.58 Mb
PubMed search
- Wikidata
View/Edit Human	View/Edit Mouse

Tubby-related protein 1 is a protein that in humans is encoded by the TULP1 gene.

TULP1 is a member of a family of tubby-like genes (TULPs) that encode proteins of unknown function. Members of this family have been identified in plants, vertebrates, and invertebrates.

The TULP proteins share a conserved C-terminal region of approximately 200 amino acid residues. TULP1 is a candidate gene for retinitis pigmentosa-14 (RP). Mutation in TULP1 is a rare cause of recessive RP and TULP1 plays an essential role in the physiology of photoreceptors.
