= PRPF4 =

Protein-coding gene in the species Homo sapiens

Identifiers
- Aliases: PRPF4, HPRP4, HPRP4P, PRP4, Prp4p, RP70, SNRNP60, pre-mRNA processing factor 4
- External IDs: OMIM: 607795; MGI: 1917302; GeneCards: PRPF4
Available structures
PDB	Ortholog search: PDBe RCSB
PDB	List of PDB id codes 1MZW, 3JCR

Gene location (Human)
Chr.	Chromosome 9 (human)
Band	9q32	Start	113,275,642 bp
Band	9q32	End	113,294,009 bp

Gene location (Mouse)
Chr.	Chromosome 4 (mouse)
Band	4|4 B3	Start	62,327,034 bp
Band	4|4 B3	End	62,345,227 bp
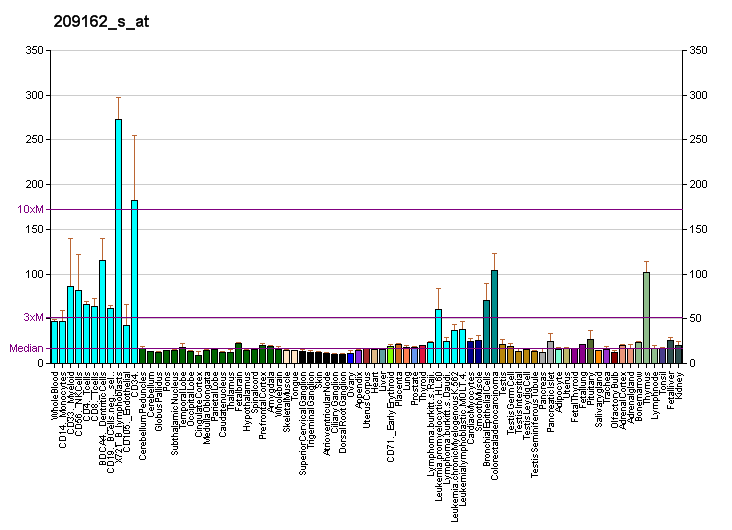

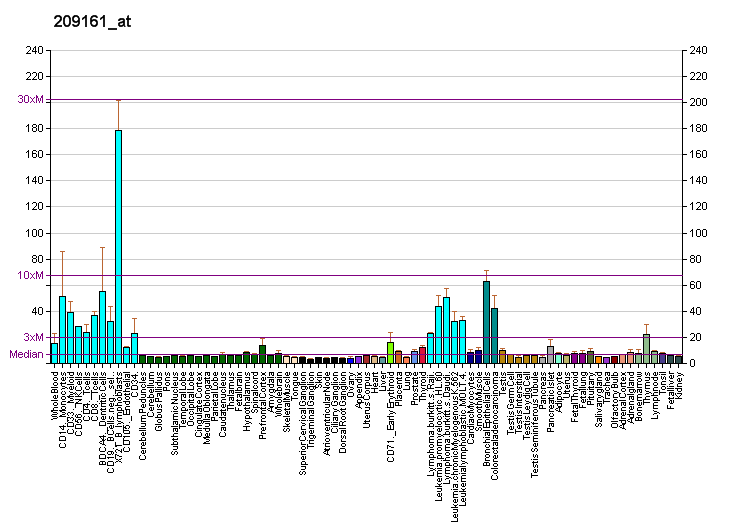
RNA expression pattern
Bgee	Human / Mouse (ortholog); Top expressed in: secondary oocyte; corpus epididymis; cartilage tissue; endothelial cell; islet of Langerhans; tail of epididymis; caput epididymis; embryo; Skeletal muscle tissue of biceps brachii; ventricular zone / Top expressed in: hand; maxillary prominence; epiblast; mandibular prominence; foot; yolk sac; interventricular septum; primitive streak; cumulus cell; superior cervical ganglion; More reference expression data
BioGPS	More reference expression data
Gene ontology
Molecular function	U4 snRNA binding; protein binding; U6 snRNA binding
Cellular component	Cajal body; nuclear speck; spliceosomal complex; spliceosomal snRNP complex; U4/U6 snRNP; nucleoplasm; U4/U6 x U5 tri-snRNP complex; nucleus; U2-type precatalytic spliceosome
Biological process	RNA splicing, via transesterification reactions; mRNA processing; RNA processing; RNA splicing; mRNA splicing, via spliceosome
Sources:Amigo / QuickGO
Orthologs
Databases	NCBI: entry; OMA: entry
Species	Human	Mouse
Entrez	9128	70052
Ensembl	ENSG00000136875	ENSMUSG00000066148
UniProt	O43172	Q9DAW6
RefSeq (mRNA)	NM_001244926; NM_004697; NM_001322266; NM_001322267	NM_027297
RefSeq (protein)	NP_001231855; NP_001309195; NP_001309196; NP_004688	NP_081573
Location (UCSC)	Chr 9: 113.28 – 113.29 Mb	Chr 4: 62.33 – 62.35 Mb
PubMed search
- Wikidata
View/Edit Human	View/Edit Mouse

U4/U6 small nuclear ribonucleoprotein Prp4 is a protein that is found in humans and encoded by the PRPF4 gene.

The removal of introns from nuclear pre-mRNAs occurs on complexes called spliceosomes, which are made up of 4 small nuclear ribonucleoprotein (snRNP) particles and an undefined number of transiently associated splicing factors.

PRPF4 is 1 of several proteins that associates with U4 and U6 snRNPs.[supplied by OMIM]
