= Transcorneal electrical stimulation =

Transcorneal electrical stimulation (TES) is a therapy developed for use in patients with a variety of eye diseases. The procedure involves placing electrodes in the form of contact lenses upon the patient's corneas, with a reference electrode on the skin near each eye. A weak current is delivered through the electrodes, with the intent of stimulating the visual system and enhancing its activity.

As of 2022, the technique was still in the early stages of research in human patients. A review of literature published in 2020 estimated this therapy as "probably effective" in the treatment of retinitis pigmentosa, based on the evidence available at the time.
