= GUCY2D =

Protein-coding gene in the species Homo sapiens

Identifiers
- Aliases: GUCY2D, CORD5, CORD6, CYGD, GUC1A4, GUC2D, LCA, LCA1, RCD2, RETGC-1, ROS-GC1, ROSGC, retGC, guanylate cyclase 2D, retinal, CACD1, CSNB1I, CG-E
- External IDs: OMIM: 600179; MGI: 105123; GeneCards: GUCY2D
Available structures
| PDB | Ortholog search: PDBe RCSB |
| PDB | List of PDB id codes 1AWL |
Enzyme activity
| EC # | BRENDA | ExPASy | KEGG | MetaCyc |
|---|---|---|---|---|
| 4.6.1.2 | ↗ | ↗ | ↗ | ↗ |

Gene location (Human)
| Chr. | Chromosome 17 (human) |
| Band | 17p13.1 | Start | 8,002,615 bp |
| Band | 17p13.1 | End | 8,020,342 bp |

Gene location (Mouse)
| Chr. | Chromosome 11 (mouse) |
| Band | 11 B3|11 42.51 cM | Start | 69,108,943 bp |
| Band | 11 B3|11 42.51 cM | End | 69,127,862 bp |
RNA expression pattern
| Bgee | Human / Mouse (ortholog); Top expressed in: mucosa of esophagus; white blood cell; monocyte; minor salivary glands; granulocyte; vagina; right lung; lymph node; prostate; primary visual cortex / Top expressed in: neural layer of retina; secondary oocyte; zygote; morula; embryo; primary oocyte; dentate gyrus of hippocampal formation granule cell; outer nuclear layer; primary visual cortex; blastocyst; More reference expression data |
| BioGPS | n/a |
Gene ontology
| Molecular function | protein kinase activity; nucleotide binding; GTP binding; protein binding; lyase activity; phosphorus-oxygen lyase activity; ATP binding; guanylate cyclase activity; signaling receptor activity; adenylate cyclase activity; peptide receptor activity |
| Cellular component | integral component of membrane; membrane; integral component of plasma membrane; photoreceptor disc membrane; guanylate cyclase complex, soluble; nuclear outer membrane; plasma membrane |
| Biological process | intracellular signal transduction; response to stimulus; regulation of rhodopsin mediated signaling pathway; cyclic nucleotide biosynthetic process; receptor guanylyl cyclase signaling pathway; protein phosphorylation; visual perception; cGMP biosynthetic process; signal transduction |
Sources:Amigo / QuickGO
Orthologs
| Databases | NCBI: entry; OMA: entry |
| Species | Human | Mouse |
| Entrez | 3000 | 14919 |
| Ensembl | ENSG00000132518 | ENSMUSG00000020890 |
| UniProt | Q02846 | P52785 |
| RefSeq (mRNA) | NM_000180 | NM_008192 |
| RefSeq (protein) | NP_000171 | NP_032218 |
| Location (UCSC) | Chr 17: 8 – 8.02 Mb | Chr 11: 69.11 – 69.13 Mb |
| PubMed search |
- Wikidata
| View/Edit Human | View/Edit Mouse |

Retinal guanylyl cyclase 1 also known as guanylate cyclase 2D, retinal is an enzyme that in humans is encoded by the GUCY2D (guanylate cyclase 2D) gene.

== Function ==
This gene encodes a retina-specific guanylate cyclase, which is a member of the membrane guanylyl cyclase family. Like other membrane guanylyl cyclases, this enzyme has a hydrophobic amino-terminal signal sequence followed by a large extracellular domain, a single membrane spanning domain, a kinase homology domain, and a guanylyl cyclase catalytic domain. In contrast to other membrane guanylyl cyclases, this enzyme is not activated by natriuretic peptides.

The nomenclature for members of the Gucy2 gene family is not consistent across species. In many mammals, including mice and rats, the Gucy2d gene encodes a related protein – GC-D – that is specifically expressed in a subpopulation of olfactory sensory neurons. This gene is a pseudogene in humans and most other primates. In rodents, the corresponding (orthologous) gene to human GUCY2D is Gucy2e.

== Clinical significance ==
Mutations in this gene result in Leber's congenital amaurosis and cone-rod dystrophy-6 diseases.
