= SNRNP200 =

Protein-coding gene in humans

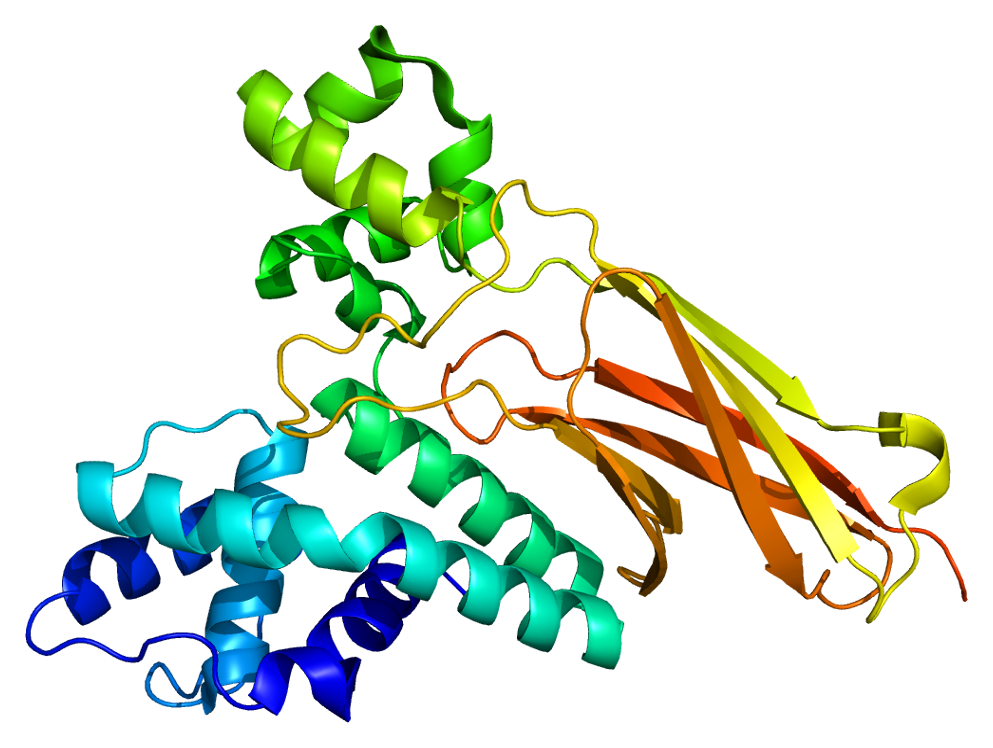

Identifiers
- Aliases: SNRNP200, ASCC3L1, BRR2, HELIC2, RP33, U5-200KD, small nuclear ribonucleoprotein U5 subunit 200
- External IDs: OMIM: 601664; MGI: 2444401; GeneCards: SNRNP200
Available structures
| PDB | Ortholog search: PDBe RCSB |
| PDB | List of PDB id codes 2Q0Z, 4F91, 4F92, 4F93, 4KIT, 3JCR |
Enzyme activity
| EC # | BRENDA | ExPASy | KEGG | MetaCyc |
|---|---|---|---|---|
| 3.6.4.13 | ↗ | ↗ | ↗ | ↗ |

Gene location (Human)
| Chr. | Chromosome 2 (human) |
| Band | 2q11.2 | Start | 96,274,338 bp |
| Band | 2q11.2 | End | 96,321,271 bp |

Gene location (Mouse)
| Chr. | Chromosome 2 (mouse) |
| Band | 2 F1|2 61.84 cM | Start | 127,050,306 bp |
| Band | 2 F1|2 61.84 cM | End | 127,082,371 bp |
RNA expression pattern
| Bgee | Human / Mouse (ortholog); Top expressed in: ventricular zone; embryo; epithelium of nasopharynx; ganglionic eminence; nasal epithelium; urethra; parotid gland; pylorus; nipple; tibia / Top expressed in: hand; otic vesicle; mandibular prominence; maxillary prominence; primitive streak; condyle; abdominal wall; Paneth cell; Gonadal ridge; otolith organ; More reference expression data |
| BioGPS | More reference expression data |
Gene ontology
| Molecular function | nucleotide binding; helicase activity; protein binding; identical protein binding; nucleic acid binding; hydrolase activity; ATP binding; RNA binding |
| Cellular component | catalytic step 2 spliceosome; membrane; U5 snRNP; nucleoplasm; spliceosomal complex; nucleus; U4/U6 x U5 tri-snRNP complex; post-mRNA release spliceosomal complex |
| Biological process | mRNA splicing, via spliceosome; mRNA processing; osteoblast differentiation; cis assembly of pre-catalytic spliceosome; RNA splicing; spliceosome conformational change to release U4 (or U4atac) and U1 (or U11) |
Sources:Amigo / QuickGO
Orthologs
| Databases | NCBI: entry; OMA: entry |
| Species | Human | Mouse |
| Entrez | 23020 | 320632 |
| Ensembl | ENSG00000144028 | ENSMUSG00000003660 |
| UniProt | O75643 | Q6P4T2 |
| RefSeq (mRNA) | NM_014014 | NM_177214 |
| RefSeq (protein) | NP_054733 | NP_796188 |
| Location (UCSC) | Chr 2: 96.27 – 96.32 Mb | Chr 2: 127.05 – 127.08 Mb |
| PubMed search |
- Wikidata
| View/Edit Human | View/Edit Mouse |

U5 small nuclear ribonucleoprotein 200 kDa helicase is an enzyme that in humans is encoded by the SNRNP200 gene. This enzyme functions to unwind the U4/U6 RNA duplices as part of the assembly of the spliceosome during mRNA splicing.
