= PRPF6 =

Protein-coding gene in the species Homo sapiens

Identifiers
- Aliases: PRPF6, ANT-1, ANT1, C20orf14, Prp6, RP60, SNRNP102, TOM, U5-102K, hPrp6, pre-mRNA processing factor 6
- External IDs: OMIM: 613979; MGI: 1922946; GeneCards: PRPF6
Available structures
PDB	Ortholog search: PDBe RCSB
PDB	List of PDB id codes 3JCR

Gene location (Human)
Chr.	Chromosome 20 (human)
Band	20q13.33	Start	63,981,132 bp
Band	20q13.33	End	64,033,100 bp

Gene location (Mouse)
Chr.	Chromosome 2 (mouse)
Band	2|2 H4	Start	181,233,661 bp
Band	2|2 H4	End	181,297,453 bp
RNA expression pattern
Bgee	Human / Mouse (ortholog); Top expressed in: tendon of biceps brachii; paraflocculus of cerebellum; beta cell; right hemisphere of cerebellum; ganglionic eminence; right uterine tube; ventricular zone; skin of leg; Achilles tendon; popliteal artery / Top expressed in: supraoptic nucleus; aortic valve; ascending aorta; Rostral migratory stream; fossa; condyle; internal carotid artery; external carotid artery; zygote; primary oocyte; More reference expression data
BioGPS	n/a
Gene ontology
Molecular function	transcription coactivator activity; protein binding; androgen receptor binding; RNA binding; ribonucleoprotein complex binding
Cellular component	U4/U6 x U5 tri-snRNP complex; catalytic step 2 spliceosome; membrane; U5 snRNP; spliceosomal complex; nucleus; nucleoplasm; nuclear speck; U2-type precatalytic spliceosome
Biological process	mRNA splicing, via spliceosome; RNA processing; spliceosomal tri-snRNP complex assembly; RNA splicing, via transesterification reactions; mRNA processing; spliceosomal complex assembly; RNA localization; positive regulation of transcription by RNA polymerase II; RNA splicing
Sources:Amigo / QuickGO
Orthologs
Databases	NCBI: entry; OMA: entry
Species	Human	Mouse
Entrez	24148	68879
Ensembl	ENSG00000101161	ENSMUSG00000002455
UniProt	O94906	Q91YR7
RefSeq (mRNA)	NM_012469	NM_133701
RefSeq (protein)	NP_036601	NP_598462
Location (UCSC)	Chr 20: 63.98 – 64.03 Mb	Chr 2: 181.23 – 181.3 Mb
PubMed search
- Wikidata
View/Edit Human	View/Edit Mouse

Pre-mRNA-processing factor 6 is a protein that in humans is encoded by the PRPF6 gene.

The protein encoded by this gene appears to be involved in pre-mRNA splicing, possibly acting as a bridging factor between U5 and U4/U6 snRNPs in formation of the spliceosome. The encoded protein also can bind androgen receptor, providing a link between transcriptional activation and splicing.

== Interactions ==
PRPF6 has been shown to interact with TXNL4B, ARAF and Androgen receptor.
