= SPATA7 =

Protein-coding gene in humans

Identifiers
- Aliases: SPATA7, HEL-S-296, HSD-3.1, HSD3, LCA3, spermatogenesis associated 7
- External IDs: OMIM: 609868; MGI: 2144877; HomoloGene: 10189; GeneCards: SPATA7; OMA:SPATA7 - orthologs

Gene location (Human)
Chr.	Chromosome 14 (human)
Band	14q31.3	Start	88,384,924 bp
Band	14q31.3	End	88,470,350 bp

Gene location (Mouse)
Chr.	Chromosome 12 (mouse)
Band	12|12 E	Start	98,594,416 bp
Band	12|12 E	End	98,636,074 bp
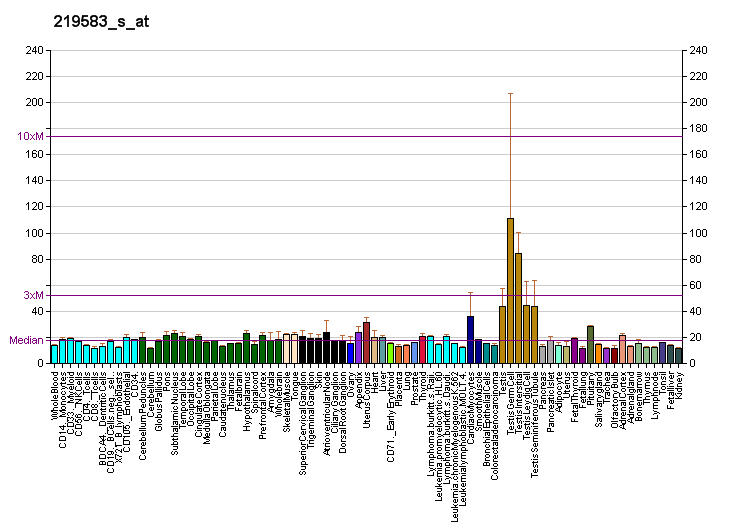
RNA expression pattern
Bgee	Human / Mouse (ortholog); Top expressed in: right testis; sperm; left testis; Achilles tendon; bronchial epithelial cell; gonad; right uterine tube; testicle; cerebellar cortex; cerebellar hemisphere / Top expressed in: spermatid; seminiferous tubule; spermatocyte; secondary oocyte; zygote; genital tubercle; supraoptic nucleus; neural tube; superior frontal gyrus; tail of embryo; More reference expression data
BioGPS	More reference expression data
Gene ontology
Molecular function	protein binding
Cellular component	microtubule cytoskeleton; cytoskeleton; axoneme; cytoplasm; ciliary basal body; cell projection; photoreceptor connecting cilium; nucleoplasm; mitochondrion; cytosol; photoreceptor outer segment
Biological process	visual perception; response to stimulus; photoreceptor cell maintenance; protein localization to photoreceptor outer segment; protein localization to photoreceptor connecting cilium
Sources:Amigo / QuickGO
Orthologs
Species	Human	Mouse
Entrez	55812	104871
Ensembl	ENSG00000042317	ENSMUSG00000021007
UniProt	Q9P0W8	Q80VP2
RefSeq (mRNA)	NM_001040428; NM_018418	NM_001289572; NM_001289573; NM_001289574; NM_178914
RefSeq (protein)	NP_001035518; NP_060888	NP_001276501; NP_001276502; NP_001276503; NP_849245
Location (UCSC)	Chr 14: 88.38 – 88.47 Mb	Chr 12: 98.59 – 98.64 Mb
PubMed search
- Wikidata
View/Edit Human	View/Edit Mouse

Spermatogenesis-associated protein 7 is a protein that in humans is encoded by the SPATA7 gene.
