= RDH12 =

Protein-coding gene in humans

Identifiers
- Aliases: RDH12, LCA13, LCA3, RP53, SDR7C2, retinol dehydrogenase 12 (all-trans/9-cis/11-cis), retinol dehydrogenase 12
- External IDs: OMIM: 608830; MGI: 1925224; GeneCards: RDH12
Enzyme activity
EC #	BRENDA	ExPASy	KEGG	MetaCyc
1.1.1.300	↗	↗	↗	↗

Gene location (Human)
Chr.	Chromosome 14 (human)
Band	14q24.1	Start	67,701,886 bp
Band	14q24.1	End	67,734,451 bp

Gene location (Mouse)
Chr.	Chromosome 12 (mouse)
Band	12|12 C3	Start	79,255,688 bp
Band	12|12 C3	End	79,269,439 bp
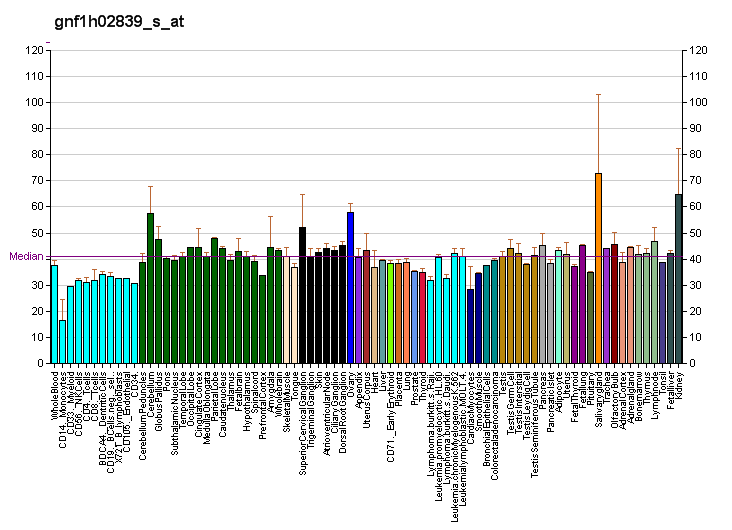

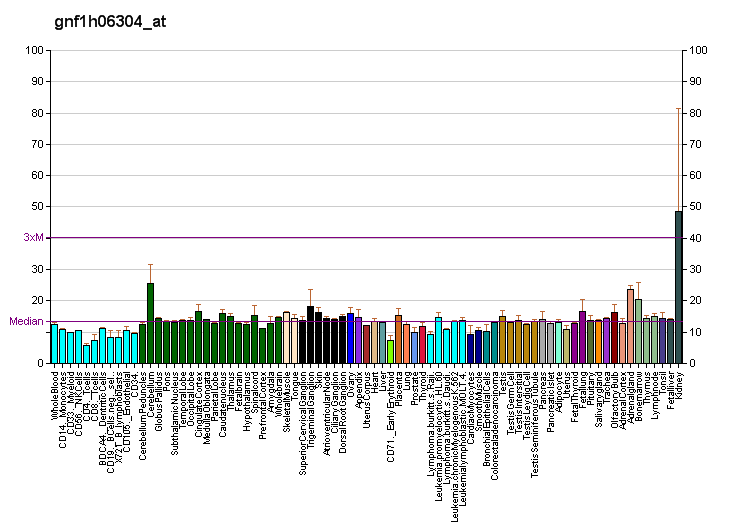

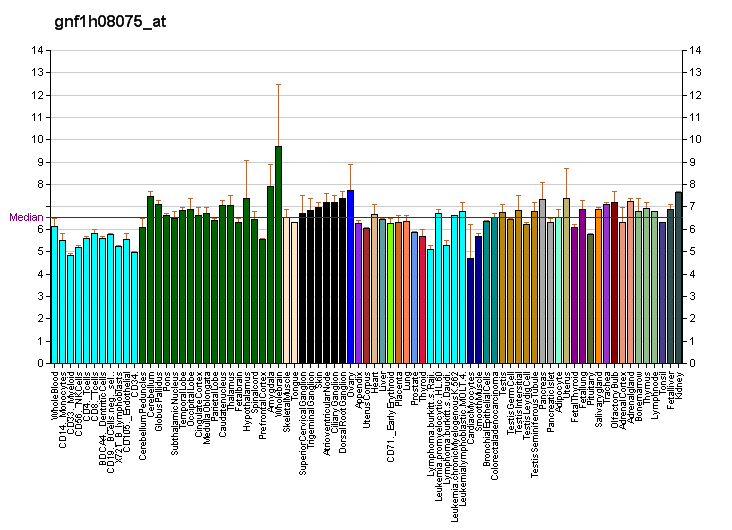
RNA expression pattern
Bgee	Human / Mouse (ortholog); Top expressed in: skin of arm; skin of leg; vulva; skin of abdomen; skin of thigh; gums; gingival epithelium; gallbladder; human penis; skin of hip / Top expressed in: neural layer of retina; granulocyte; esophagus; retinal pigment epithelium; lip; epithelium of lens; skin of external ear; secondary oocyte; skin of abdomen; skin of back; More reference expression data
BioGPS	More reference expression data
Gene ontology
Molecular function	NAD-retinol dehydrogenase activity; oxidoreductase activity; protein binding; NADP-retinol dehydrogenase activity
Cellular component	intracellular anatomical structure; photoreceptor inner segment membrane; photoreceptor inner segment; endoplasmic reticulum; endoplasmic reticulum membrane; membrane
Biological process	photoreceptor cell maintenance; visual perception; retinoid metabolic process; retinol metabolic process; response to stimulus; cellular detoxification of aldehyde
Sources:Amigo / QuickGO
Orthologs
Databases	NCBI: entry; OMA: entry
Species	Human	Mouse
Entrez	145226	77974
Ensembl	ENSG00000139988	ENSMUSG00000021123
UniProt	Q96NR8	Q8BYK4
RefSeq (mRNA)	NM_152443	NM_030017; NM_001313971
RefSeq (protein)	NP_689656	NP_001300900; NP_084293
Location (UCSC)	Chr 14: 67.7 – 67.73 Mb	Chr 12: 79.26 – 79.27 Mb
PubMed search
- Wikidata
View/Edit Human	View/Edit Mouse

Retinol dehydrogenase 12 is an enzyme that in humans is encoded by the RDH12 gene.

Retinoids are indispensable light-sensitive elements of vision and also serve as essential modulators of cellular differentiation and proliferation in diverse cell types. RDH12 belongs to a family of dual-specificity retinol dehydrogenases that metabolize both all-trans- and cis-retinols (Haeseleer et al., 2002).[supplied by OMIM]
