= Natriuretic peptide =

Hormone used in regulating the cardiovascular system

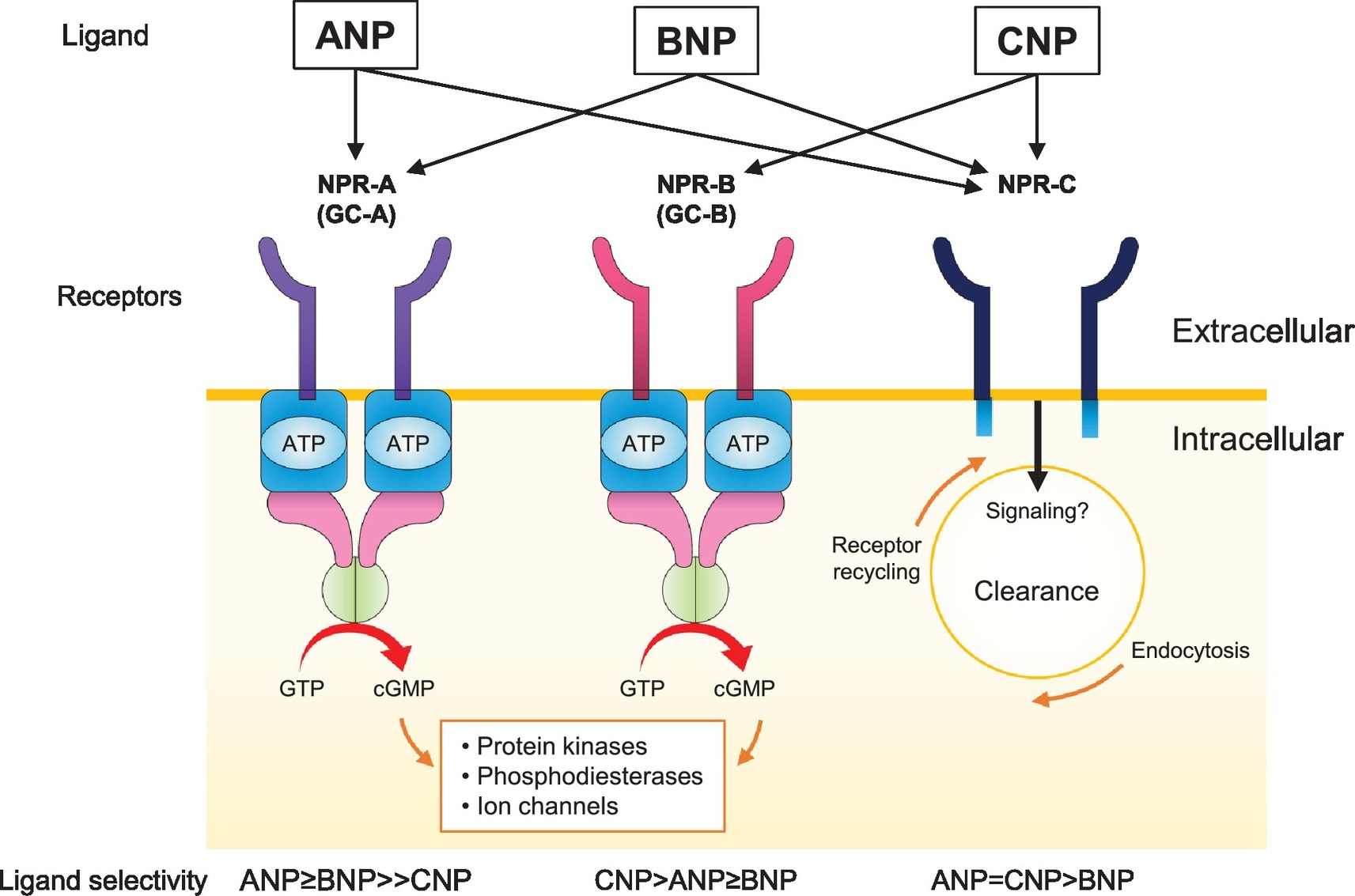
Natriuretic peptide-binding receptors and ligand selectivity.

A natriuretic peptide is a hormone molecule that plays a crucial role in the regulation of the cardiovascular system. These hormones were first discovered in the 1980s and were found to have very strong diuretic, natriuretic, and vasodilatory effects. There are three main types of natriuretic peptides: atrial natriuretic peptide (ANP), brain natriuretic peptide (BNP), and C-type natriuretic peptide (CNP). Two minor hormones include urodilatin (URO) which is processed in the kidney and encoded by the same gene as ANP, and dendroaspis NP (DNP) that was discovered through isolation of the venom from the green mamba snake. Since they are activated during heart failure, they are important for the protection of the heart and its tissues.

Additionally, there are three natriuretic peptide receptors: natriuretic peptide receptor A (NPR-A), Natriuretic Peptide Receptor-B (NPR-B), and Natriuretic Peptide Receptor-C (NPR-C). NPR-A and NPR-B use cyclic guanosine monophosphate (cGMP) as its intracellular messenger. NPR-A binds selectively to ANP and BNP while NPR-B binds selectively to CNP. Although initially thought to have no signaling activity, NPR-C is now believed to inhibit cyclic adenosine monophosphate (cAMP) using the Giα subunit along with activating phospholipase C-β using the Giβγ subunit. The three natriuretic peptides ANP, BNP, and CNP can bind to NPR-C however it has a higher affinity towards ANP and CNP. Natriuretic peptides will lose their activity when degraded by the enzyme neprilysin which is found on the plasma membrane.

== Origin ==
The existence of natriuretic peptides was predicted over fifty years ago by key cell biological observations. Atrial cells were found to contain highly developed Golgi networks and spherical granules, while balloon distension of the atria correlated with increased urination in dogs. De Bold and colleagues linked these studies and discovered the first natriuretic peptide that works by stimulating renal sodium and water secretion. Shortly after, atrial peptides with natriuretic, diuretic, and/or smooth muscle relaxing activity were purified and sequenced. The 1980s saw an increase in natriuretic peptide research, particularly due to the 1981 work by de Bold et al., which found that giving rats an extract of rat atrial tissue quickly reduced blood pressure and increased urination. To pinpoint the molecule causing this action, various structures that would eventually come to be known as an atrial natriuretic peptide, or ANP, were discovered. Kangawa and Matsuo determined the complete amino acid sequence of α-hANP using protein isolated from human atrial tissue. They were able to isolate and identify BNP and CNP from porcine brain in 1988 and 1990, respectively. The first of these hormones is most frequently referred to as atrial natriuretic peptide (ANP), whereas the second hormone, B-type natriuretic peptide (BNP), was formerly known as brain natriuretic peptide but is now more frequently linked to the cardiac ventricles of people with heart failure. C-type natriuretic peptide (CNP), the third hormone, was isolated from the swine brain and could relax smooth muscle. The three hormones share a similar structural makeup but come from different genes. These preliminary findings produced more investigation to establish the genetic makeup and regulatory mechanisms of these molecules.

== Applications ==
=== Mechanism ===
Natriuretic peptides and their receptors have many different effects on the body, such as controlling blood pressure and helping bones grow. Each peptide has its own unique effects and interacts with specific receptors. Scientists have observed these effects by studying mice with specific natriuretic peptides or receptors removed.

Natriuretic peptides have a wide range of physiological effects that include the regulation of blood pressure, fluid and electrolyte balance, and cardiovascular function. They are also involved in the regulation of vascular remodeling, inflammation, and apoptosis. One of the major clinical applications of natriuretic peptides is the diagnosing and managing of heart failure. Elevated levels of ANP and BNP are commonly found in patients with heart failure and can be used as biomarkers for the diagnosis and prognosis of this condition.

Table 1: Physiological actions of natriuretic peptides.
Target organ	Biological effects
Kidney	Increase in glomerular filtration rate by inducing vasodilatation of afferent arterioles and vasoconstriction of efferent arterioles Induction of natriuresis by inhibiting Na+, H+ exchanger in the proximal tubule, Na+, Cl− co-transporter in the distal tubule, and Na+ channels in the collecting duct Natriuretic and diuretic effects due to increased medullary blood flow Induction of diuresis due to inhibition of Arginine vasopressin-induced aquaporin-2 incorporation into collecting ducts' apical membrane
Cardiac	Preload and afterload decrease Natriuretic and diuretic effects Inhibition of cardiac remodeling (hypertrophy and fibrosis)
Hemodynamic	Vasorelaxation (via acute action on vascular smooth muscle cells and chronic effects on the permeability of vascular endothelial cells) Suppression of vascular smooth muscle cell proliferation Suppression of vascular fibrosis Reduction of pulmonary hypertension/fibrosis Elevation of capillary hydraulic conductivity Decrease in cardiac preload and afterload
Endocrine	Suppression of the following: − Renin–angiotensin–aldosterone axis − Sympathetic outflow − Arginine vasopressin − Endothelin
Mitogenesis	Stimulation of long bone growth Inhibition of growth factor-mediated hypertrophy in fibroblasts

C-type natriuretic peptide (CNP) primarily interacts with NPR-B, which triggers an increase in the concentration of cGMP in the cell. This process can lead to several physiological effects, such as tissue remodeling, reduction of pulmonary hypertension and fibrosis, and stimulation of long bone growth. CNP is highly concentrated in vascular endothelial cells and plays a crucial role in regulating vascular tone through its vasodilatory action. Furthermore, CNP has been shown to have anti proliferative effects on vascular smooth muscle and an inhibitory effect on the migration of human coronary artery smooth muscle cells.

=== Biological effects and uses ===
Studies on mice have helped researchers understand the critical role of ANP in preventing hypertension or high blood pressure. When ANP-deficient mice were studied, they showed signs of hypertension when consuming too much salt. Similarly, when NPR-A, a receptor for ANP, was knocked out in mice, they also displayed hypertension and a reduced response to diuretics. This suggests that ANP is essential in regulating blood pressure and fluid balance. Interestingly, when NPR-A was knocked out specifically in the endothelial cells lining blood vessels, mice showed increased plasma volume, suggesting that ANP may regulate fluid balance by increasing the permeability of blood vessels in these cells. These findings indicate that ANP and its receptor NPR-A are essential in regulating mice's blood pressure and fluid balance.

Recent advances in the biology of natriuretic peptides (NPs) have led to the developing of "designer" NPs. These peptides have larger surface areas compared to smaller natural molecules, making them better suited for activating specific receptors with minimal off-target effects. While inhibiting enzymatic degradation of peptides can boost endogenous peptides, it may not be enough to achieve optimal receptor stimulation. Therefore, designer peptides with specific properties could be a new strategy to improve upon existing therapies. Three designer NPs have been bioengineered, tested in cell-based assays and animal models of heart failure, undergone pharmaceutical toxicology studies, and have received FDA approval for clinical studies.

Natriuretic peptides can block the activity of the renin-angiotensin-aldosterone system (RAAS), which regulates blood pressure. Studies have shown that ANP can suppress renin secretion and aldosterone production. Additionally, natriuretic peptides suppress the sympathetic nervous system (SNS), which controls the body's "fight or flight" response. The relationship between natriuretic peptides and vasopressin, a hormone that regulates water balance, has been found through studies that have shown that ANP can suppress vasopressin signaling. Researchers are working on having a better understanding of this relationship. Animal studies show the possibility of using a vasopressin receptor antagonist along with BNP to improve heart function and blood flow.

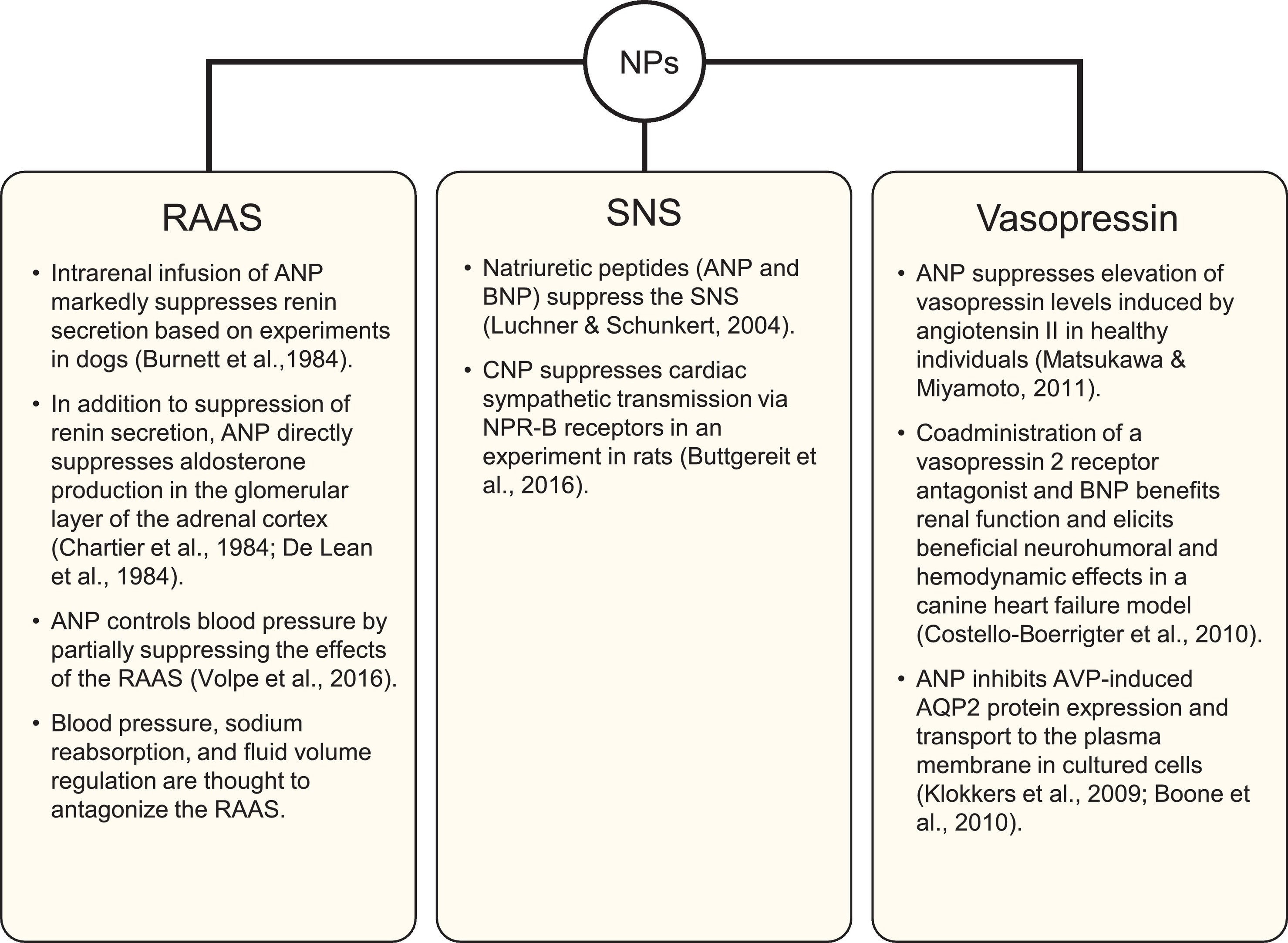
Suppression of the RAAS, SNS, and vasopressin systems by natriuretic peptides/

B-type natriuretic peptide (BNP) and its pro hormone NT-proBNP are especially useful in diagnosing heart failure, as their levels in the blood increase along with the severity of the condition. Rapid testing of BNP and NT-proBNP can also help distinguish between shortness of breath due to heart and lung-related causes. Monitoring NT-proBNP levels over time can provide important information about an individual's risk of developing heart failure or cardiovascular disease in the future.

It can be difficult to tell if someone's having trouble breathing because of heart or lung problems. However, this can often be clarified with tests like X-rays and blood work. Rapid testing of BNP and NT-proBNP can also tell if the problem is in the heart or the lungs, though, specific lung problems can also raise NP levels. Due to this, BNP levels can be high for cases other than heart failure.

== Major types ==
=== Atrial Natriuretic Peptide (ANP) ===
The human gene that makes ANP is called NPPA, and it's on chromosome 1 at location 1p36.21. The gene is about two kilobases long and has three parts called exons and two called introns. The mRNA from this gene makes a protein called preproANP with 151 parts called amino acids. The first 25 parts are removed to create a 126-part protein called proANP which is stored in the atrial granules. When the body needs ANP, Corin (an enzyme) breaks apart proANP to make the active form of ANP, which is 28 amino acids long.

=== Brain Natriuretic Peptide (BNP) ===
BNP was first discovered in pig brain tissue but was later found more abundant in the heart (Mukoyama et al. 1991; Mukoyama et al. 1990). The human gene that encodes for BNP is called NPPB (GeneID 4879) and is located on chromosome 1 at 1p36.2. In mice, NPPb is found on chromosome 4. NPPB has three exons and two introns, and its preproBNP comprises 134 amino acids. This includes a 26 amino acid signal sequence followed by 108 amino acids that contain proBNP. Unlike ANP, the sequence of BNP is not similar across different species.

=== C-type Natriuretic Peptide (CNP) ===
The natriuretic peptide CNP was initially discovered in pig brain extracts. Most CNP is found in the brain, although it can also be found in chondrocytes and the blood vessel lining cells. The human gene for CNP (NPPC), in contrast to the genes for ANP and BNP, is located on chromosome 2 and consists of just two exons and one intron. The CNP gene is also located on chromosome 2 in mice. The 126 amino acids long protein produced by NPPC has a signal sequence of 23 amino acids and then a proCNP segment with 103 amino acids.

== See also ==
- Nesiritide
- Carperitide
- CD-NP
- Ularitide
