= Cenderitide =

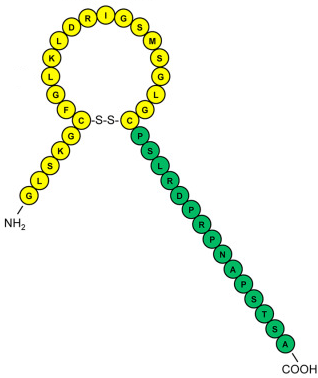
- Amino acid sequence of cenderitide

Legal status
- Legal status: Investigational

Identifiers
- IUPAC name: glycyl-L-leucyl-L-seryl-L-lysylglycyl-L-cysteinyl-L-phenylalanylglycyl-L-leucyl-L-lysyl-L-leucyl-L-α-aspartyl-L-arginyl-L-isoleucylglycyl-L-seryl-L-methionyl-L-serylglycyl-L-leucylglycyl-L-cysteinyl-L-prolyl-L-seryl-L-leucyl-L-arginyl-L-α-aspartyl-L-prolyl-L-arginyl-L-prolyl-L-asparaginyl-L-alanyl-L-prolyl-L-seryl-L-threonyl-L-seryl-L-alanine, cyclic (6→22)-disulfide
- CAS Number: 507289-11-4
- DrugBank: 11777
- UNII: 9NKZ9LYZ06
- KEGG: D10063

Cenderitide (also known as chimeric natriuretic peptide or CD-NP) is a natriuretic peptide developed by the Mayo Clinic as a potential treatment for heart failure. Cenderitide is created by the fusion of the 15 amino acid C-terminus of the snake venom dendroaspis natriuretic peptide (DNP) with the full C-type natriuretic peptide (CNP) structure. This peptide chimera is a dual activator of the natriuretic peptide receptors NPR-A and NPR-B and therefore exhibits the natriuretic and diuretic properties of DNP, as well as the antiproliferative and antifibrotic properties of CNP.

== Molecular problem: fibrosis ==
When faced with pressure overload, the heart attempts to compensate with a number of structural alterations including hypertrophy of cardiomyocytes and increase of extracellular matrix (ECM) proteins. Rapid accumulation of ECM proteins causes excessive fibrosis resulting in decreased myocardial compliance and increased myocardial stiffness. The exact mechanisms involved in excessive fibrosis are not fully understood but there is evidence that supports involvement from local growth factors FGF-2, TGF-beta and platelet-derived growth factor. TGF-β1 plays an important role in cardiac remodelling through the stimulation of fibroblast proliferation, ECM deposition and myocyte hypertrophy. The increase in TGF-beta 1 expression in a pressure-overloaded heart correlates with the degree of fibrosis, suggesting TGF-beta 1 involvement in the progression from a compensated hypertrophy to failure. Through an autocrine mechanism, TGF-beta 1 acts on fibroblasts by binding TGF-beta 1 receptors 1 and 2. Upon receptor activation, the receptor-associated transcription factor Smad becomes phosphorylated and associates with Co-Smad. This newly formed Smad-Co-Smad complex enters the nucleus where it acts as a transcription factor modulating gene expression. Cardiac remodelling of the ECM is also regulated by the CNP/NPR-B pathway as demonstrated by the improved outcomes in transgenic mice with CNP over-expression subjected to myocardial infarction. Binding of CNP to NPR-B catalyzes the synthesis of cGMP, which is responsible for mediating the anti-fibrotic effects of CNP. Fibrotic heart tissue is associated with an increase risk of ventricular dysfunction which can ultimately lead to heart failure. Thus, anti-fibrotic strategies are a promising approach in the prevention and treatment of heart failure.

== Molecular mechanism ==
As cenderitide interacts with both NRP-A and NRP-B, this drug has antifibrotic potential. Binding of cenderitide to NRP-B elicits an antifibrotic response by catalyzing formation of cGMP similar to the response seen with endogenous CNP. Additionally, in vitro study of human fibroblasts demonstrates that cenderitide reduces TGF-beta 1 induced collagen production. These two proposed mechanisms illustrate therapeutic potential for the reduction of fibrotic remodelling in the hypertensive heart. Through combined effects of CNP and DNP, cenderitide treatment results in a reduction in stress on the heart (through natriuresis/diuresis) and inhibition of pro-fibrotic, remodeling pathways.
