= Atrial natriuretic peptide =

Cardiac hormone which increases renal sodium excretion

NPPA
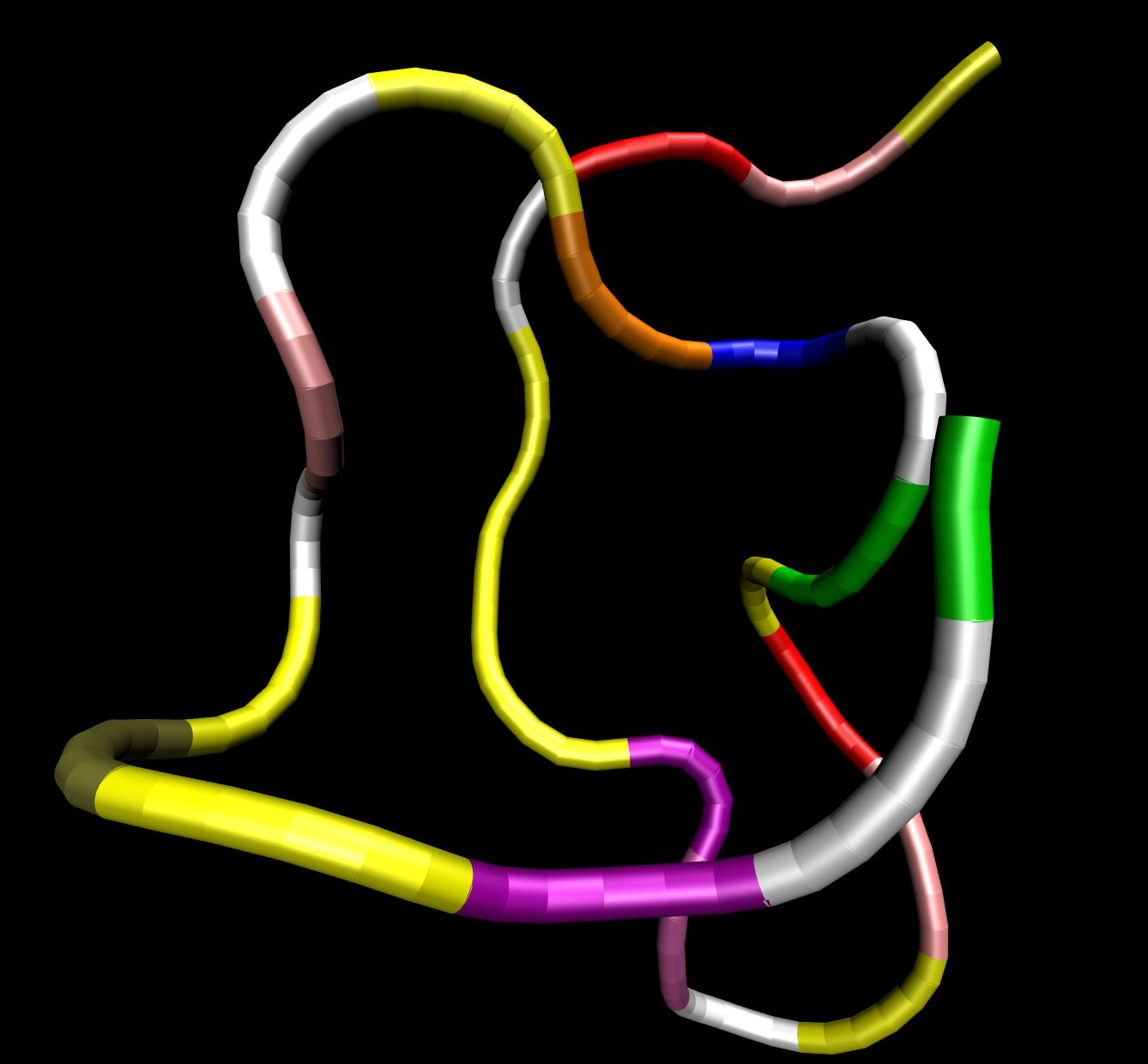

Identifiers
- Aliases: NPPA, ANF, ANP, ATFB6, ATRST2, CDD, CDD-ANF, CDP, PND, Atrial natriuretic peptide, natriuretic peptide A
- External IDs: OMIM: 108780; MGI: 97367; GeneCards: NPPA
Available structures
PDB	Ortholog search: PDBe RCSB
PDB	List of PDB id codes 1ANP, 1YK0, 3N57

Gene location (Human)
Chr.	Chromosome 1 (human)
Band	1p36.22	Start	11,845,709 bp
Band	1p36.22	End	11,848,345 bp

Gene location (Mouse)
Chr.	Chromosome 4 (mouse)
Band	4 E1|4 78.66 cM	Start	148,085,179 bp
Band	4 E1|4 78.66 cM	End	148,086,536 bp
RNA expression pattern
Bgee	Human / Mouse (ortholog); Top expressed in: cardiac muscle tissue of right atrium; right auricle of heart; vena cava; apex of heart; pancreatic ductal cell; left ventricle; myocardium of left ventricle; right ventricle; parotid gland; triceps brachii muscle / Top expressed in: atrium; atrioventricular valve; aortic valve; endocardial cushion; myocardium of ventricle; cardiac muscles; primordial ventricle; interventricular septum; right ventricle; cardiac muscle tissue of atrium; More reference expression data
BioGPS	n/a
Gene ontology
Molecular function	neuropeptide receptor binding; hormone activity; peptide hormone receptor binding; neuropeptide hormone activity; protein binding; signaling receptor binding; hormone receptor binding
Cellular component	cytoplasm; mast cell granule; nucleus; perinuclear region of cytoplasm; extracellular region; extracellular space; extracellular matrix; protein-containing complex; collagen-containing extracellular matrix
Biological process	response to muscle stretch; positive regulation of cardiac muscle contraction; response to hypoxia; regulation of high voltage-gated calcium channel activity; neuropeptide signaling pathway; female pregnancy; regulation of cardiac conduction; negative regulation of collecting lymphatic vessel constriction; positive regulation of potassium ion export across plasma membrane; positive regulation of heart rate; positive regulation of delayed rectifier potassium channel activity; cGMP biosynthetic process; regulation of blood pressure; negative regulation of systemic arterial blood pressure; regulation of calcium ion transmembrane transport via high voltage-gated calcium channel; transcription initiation from RNA polymerase II promoter; regulation of atrial cardiac muscle cell membrane repolarization; response to insulin; cell growth involved in cardiac muscle cell development; negative regulation of cell growth; cardiac muscle hypertrophy in response to stress; cellular response to mechanical stimulus; receptor guanylyl cyclase signaling pathway; protein folding; regulation of signaling receptor activity; positive regulation of histamine secretion by mast cell; positive regulation of cGMP-mediated signaling; cGMP-mediated signaling
Sources:Amigo / QuickGO
Orthologs
Databases	NCBI: entry; OMA: entry
Species	Human	Mouse
Entrez	4878	230899
Ensembl	ENSG00000175206	ENSMUSG00000041616
UniProt	P01160	P05125
RefSeq (mRNA)	NM_006172	NM_008725
RefSeq (protein)	NP_006163	NP_032751
Location (UCSC)	Chr 1: 11.85 – 11.85 Mb	Chr 4: 148.09 – 148.09 Mb
PubMed search
- Wikidata
View/Edit Human	View/Edit Mouse

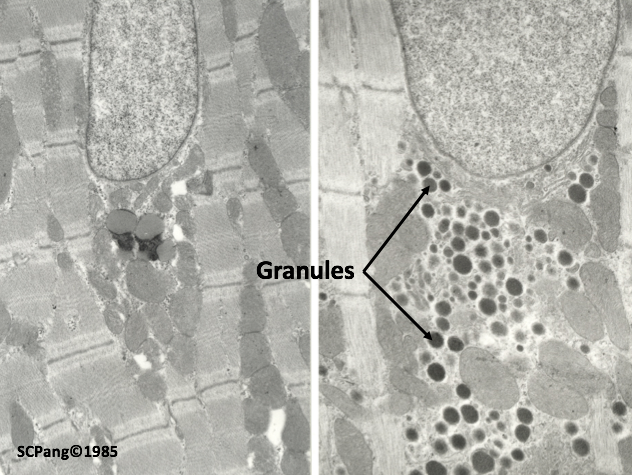
Electron micrograph of ventricular (left) and atrial myocyte (right) showing location of ANP storage granules in a mouse model. Captured by Dr. Stephen C. Pang from Queen's University.

Atrial natriuretic peptide (natriuretic polypeptide (ANP) or atrial natriuretic factor (ANF) is a natriuretic peptide hormone secreted from the cardiac atria that in humans is encoded by the NPPA gene. Natriuretic peptides (ANP, BNP, and CNP) are a family of hormone/paracrine factors that are structurally related. The main function of ANP is causing a reduction in expanded extracellular fluid (ECF) volume by increasing renal sodium excretion. ANP is synthesized and secreted by cardiac muscle cells in the walls of the atria in the heart. These cells contain volume receptors which respond to increased stretching of the atrial wall due to increased atrial blood volume.

Reduction of blood volume by ANP can result in secondary effects such as reduction of extracellular fluid (ECF) volume, improved cardiac ejection fraction with resultant improved organ perfusion, decreased blood pressure, and increased serum potassium. These effects may be blunted or negated by various counter-regulatory mechanisms operating concurrently on each of these secondary effects.

Brain natriuretic peptide (BNP) – a misnomer; it is secreted by cardiac muscle cells in the heart ventricles – is similar to ANP in its effect. It acts via the same receptors as ANP does, but with 10-fold lower affinity than ANP. The biological half-life of BNP, however, is twice as long as that of ANP, and that of NT-proBNP is even longer, making these peptides better choices than ANP for diagnostic blood testing.

== Clinical significance ==
A member of the natriuretic peptide gene family, NPPA encodes an important cardiac signaling molecule known as atrial natriuretic peptide/factor (ANP). ANP carries out endocrine functions of the heart. It acts as a diuretic by inhibiting sodium reabsorption in the kidneys. ANP also acts in the heart to prevent cardiac hypertrophy and to regulate vascular remodeling and energy metabolism. NPPA expression is varied throughout mammalian development into adulthood. Fetal expression of NPPA is associated with the formation of chamber myocardium, muscle cells of the atria and ventricles in the early developing heart. Early expression of this gene has been associated with ventricular hypertrophy in both in vitro and in vivo models. NPPA variants affect plasma ANP concentrations, blood pressure levels, and cardiovascular diseases such as atrial fibrillation (AF). ANP-deficient mice were found to have a large increase in heart and left ventricular weight in response to volume overload, which is normally prevented by proper regulation of blood pressure. Using a knock-in (KI) rat model, researchers found an AF-associated human variant in NPPA caused inflammation, fibroblast activation, atrial fibrosis, and AF in KI rats. These findings suggest NPPA is a critical gene in cardiac development and dysfunction of this gene can lead to heart problems via altered ANP levels.

== Discovery ==
The discovery of a natriuretic factor (one that promotes kidney excretion of salt and water) was first reported by Adolfo José de Bold in 1981 when rat atrial extracts were found to contain a substance that increased salt and urine output in the kidney. Later, the substance was purified from heart tissue by several groups and named atrial natriuretic factor (ANF) or ANP.

== Structure ==
ANP is a 28-amino acid peptide with a 17-amino acid ring in the middle of the molecule. The ring is formed by a disulfide bond between two cysteine residues at positions 7 and 23. ANP is closely related to BNP (brain natriuretic peptide) and CNP (C-type natriuretic peptide), which all share a similar amino acid ring structure. ANP is one of a family of nine structurally similar natriuretic hormones: seven are atrial in origin.

== Production ==
ANP is synthesized as an inactive preprohormone, encoded by the human NPPA gene located on the short arm of chromosome 1. The NPPA gene is expressed primarily in atrial myocytes and consists of 2 introns and three exons, with translation of this gene yielding a high molecular mass 151 amino acid polypeptide known as preproANP. The preprohormone is activated via post-translational modification that involves cleavage of the 25 amino acid signal sequence to produce proANP (26–151), a 126 amino acid peptide that is the major form of ANP stored in intracellular granules of the atria. Following stimulation of atrial cells, proANP is released and rapidly converted to the 28-amino-acid C-terminal mature ANP (124–151) on the cell surface by the cardiac transmembrane serine protease corin; the remaining N-terminal part is called "NT-proANP" (26–123).

ANP is secreted in response to:

- Stretching of the atrial wall, via Atrial volume receptors
- Increased Sympathetic stimulation of β-adrenoceptors
- Increased sodium concentration (hypernatremia), though sodium concentration is not the direct stimulus for increased ANP secretion
- Endothelin, a potent vasoconstrictor

Recently, it was discovered that ANP also can be O-glycosylated.

== Receptors ==
Three types of atrial natriuretic peptide receptors have been identified on which natriuretic peptides act. They are all cell surface receptors and designated:

- guanylyl cyclase-A (GC-A) also known as natriuretic peptide receptor-A (NPRA/ANP_{A}) or NPR1
- guanylyl cyclase-B (GC-B) also known as natriuretic peptide receptor-B (NPRB/ANP_{B}) or NPR2
- natriuretic peptide clearance receptor (NPRC/ANP_{C}) or NPR3

NPR-A and NPR-B have a single membrane-spanning segment with an extracellular domain that binds the ligand. The intracellular domain maintains two consensus catalytic domains for guanylyl cyclase activity. Binding of a natriuretic peptide induces a conformational change in the receptor that causes receptor dimerization and activation.

The binding of ANP to its receptor causes the conversion of GTP to cGMP and raises intracellular cGMP. As a consequence, cGMP activates a cGMP-dependent kinase (PKG or cGK) that phosphorylates proteins at specific serine and threonine residues. In the medullary collecting duct, the cGMP generated in response to ANP may act not only through PKG but also via direct modulation of ion channels.

NPR-C functions mainly as a clearance receptor by binding and sequestering ANP from the circulation. All natriuretic peptides are bound by the NPR-C.

== Physiological effects ==
Maintenance of the ECF volume (space), and its subcompartment the vascular space, is crucial for survival. These compartments are maintained within a narrow range, despite wide variations in dietary sodium intake. There are three volume regulating systems: two salt saving systems, the renin angiotensin aldosterone system (RAAS) and the renal sympathetic system (RSS); and the salt excreting natriuretic peptide (NP) hormone system. When the vascular space contracts, the RAAS and RSS are "turned on"; when the atria expand, NPs are "turned on". Each system also suppresses its counteracting system(s). NPs are made in cardiac, intestinal, renal, and adrenal tissue: ANP in one of a family of cardiac NPs: others are BNP, CNP, and DNP.

ANP binds to a specific set of receptors – ANP receptors. Receptor-agonist binding causes the increase in renal sodium excretion, which results in a decreased ECF and blood volume. Secondary effects may be an improvement in cardiac ejection fraction and reduction of systemic blood pressure.

=== Renal ===
ANP acts on the kidney to increase sodium and water excretion (natriuresis) in the following ways:

- The medullary collecting duct is the main site of ANP regulation of sodium excretion. ANP effects sodium channels at both the apical and basolateral sides. ANP inhibits ENaC on the apical side and the sodium potassium ATPase pump on the basolateral side in a cGMP PKG dependent manner resulting in less sodium re-absorption and more sodium excretion.
- ANP increases glomerular filtration rate and glomerular permeability. ANP directly dilates the afferent arteriole and counteracts the norepinephrine induced vasoconstriction of the afferent arteriole. Some studies suggest that ANP also constricts the efferent arteriole, but this is not a unanimous finding. ANP inhibits the effect of Angiotensin II on the mesangial cells, thereby relaxing them. ANP increases the radius and number of glomerular pores, thereby increasing glomerular permeability and resulting in greater filter load of sodium and water.
- Increases blood flow through the vasa recta, which will wash the solutes (sodium chloride (NaCl), and urea) out of the medullary interstitium. The lower osmolarity of the medullary interstitium leads to less reabsorption of tubular fluid and increased excretion.
- Decreases sodium reabsorption at least in the thick ascending limb (interaction with NKCC2) and cortical collecting duct of the nephron via guanosine 3',5'-cyclic monophosphate (cGMP) dependent phosphorylation of ENaC.
- It inhibits renin secretion, thereby inhibiting the production of angiotensin and aldosterone.
- It inhibits the renal sympathetic nervous system.

ANP has the opposite effect of angiotensin II on the kidney: angiotensin II increases renal sodium retention and ANP increases renal sodium loss.

=== Adrenal ===
- Reduces aldosterone secretion by the zona glomerulosa of the adrenal cortex.

=== Vascular ===
Relaxes vascular smooth muscle in arterioles and venules by:

- Membrane Receptor-mediated elevation of vascular smooth muscle cGMP
- Inhibition of the effects of catecholamines

Promotes uterine spiral artery remodeling, which is important for preventing pregnancy-induced hypertension.

=== Cardiac ===
- ANP inhibits cardiac hypertrophy in heart failure as well as fibrosis. Fibrosis is inhibited by preventing fibroblasts from entering heart tissue and replicating, as well as decreasing inflammation. ANP prevents hypertrophy by inhibiting calcium influx that is caused by norepinephrine.
- Re-expression of NPRA rescues the phenotype.

=== Adipose tissue ===
- Increases the release of free fatty acids from adipose tissue. Plasma concentrations of glycerol and nonesterified fatty acids are increased by i.v. infusion of ANP in humans.
- Activates adipocyte plasma membrane type A guanylyl cyclase receptors NPR-A
- Increases intracellular cGMP levels that induce the phosphorylation of a hormone-sensitive lipase and perilipin A via the activation of a cGMP-dependent protein kinase-I (cGK-I)
- Does not modulate cAMP production or PKA activity.

=== Immune System ===
ANP is produced locally by several immune cells. ANP is shown to regulate several functions of innate and adaptive immune system as well as shown to have cytoprotective effects.

- ANP modulates innate immunity by raising defence against extracellular microbes and inhibiting the release of pro-inflammatory markers and expression of adhesion molecules.
- There is evidence of cytoprotective effects of ANP in myocardial, vascular smooth, endothelial, hepatocytes and tumour cells.

== Degradation ==
Modulation of the effects of ANP is achieved through gradual degradation of the peptide by the enzyme neutral endopeptidase (NEP). Recently, NEP inhibitors have been developed, such as Sacubitril and Sacubitril/valsartan. They may be clinically useful in treating patients in heart failure with reduced ejection fraction .

== Biomarker ==
Fragments derived from the ANP precursor, including the signal peptide, NT-ProANP (N-terminal pro-ANP) and ANP, have been detected in human blood. ANP (28 residues long) is the active hormone while NT-proANP (98 residues) is the remaining part of proANP after cleavage by corin. ANP and associated peptides are used as biomarkers for cardiovascular diseases such as stroke, coronary artery disease, myocardial infarction and heart failure.

A part of NT-proANP called mid-regional pro-atrial natriuretic peptide (MR-proANP) is a highly sensitive biomarker in heart failure. MR-proANP levels below 120 pmol/L can be used to effectively rule out acute heart failure. MR-proANP is measured using antibodies that bind to two consecutive parts of NT-proANP, residue number 53–72 and 73–90. In contrast, traditional NT-proANP measurement use antibodies that bind to the N-terminal of NT-proANP. In either case, antibodies are only able to determine the amount of peptides matching their epitope fragments. They largely cannot differentiate between a cleaved part (NT-proANP, ANP) and the uncleaved precursor (proANP).

Large amounts of ANP secretion has been noted to cause electrolyte disturbances (hyponatremia) and polyuria. These indications can be a marker of a large atrial myxoma.

== Therapeutic use and drug development ==
Opinions regarding the use of ANP for the treatment of acute heart failure and kidney disease are varied. While this molecule has been shown to successfully restore some hemodynamic parameters following heart failure, and yield clinical improvement for kidney injury, whether it ultimately reduces mortality and its long-term effects are unknown. Therefore, more studies need to be conducted to better understand the therapeutic effects of ANP. Newly synthesized homologues of ANP molecule are being assessed for the treatment of acute heart failure. Preliminary research on one of such molecules, ularitide, has shown that this drug is safe, well tolerated, and effective in the treatment of acute heart failure.

== Other natriuretic peptides ==
Humans have three natriuretic peptide (NPPx) genes: NPPA for ANP, NPPB for BNP, and NPPC for CNP. All of these have similar structures and effects. In particular, brain natriuretic peptide (BNP) – a misnomer; it is secreted by ventricular myocytes – is similar to ANP in its effect. It acts via atrial natriuretic peptide receptors but with 10-fold lower affinity than ANP. The biological half-life of BNP, however, is twice as long as that of ANP, and that of NT-proBNP is even longer, making these peptides better choices than ANP for diagnostic blood testing.

Alternative cleavages of NPPA produces four peptides with alleged natriuretic properties: long-acting natriuretic peptide (LANP, 26–55), vessel dilator (56–92), kaliuretic peptide (104–123), and urodilatin (120–151). The former two are of a dubious nature. Adrenomedullin, produced by a gene not of the NPPx family, also has a natriuretic property. It works through a different receptor and is generally not considered an NPP.

In addition to the mammalian natriuretic peptides (ANP, BNP, CNP), other natriuretic peptides with similar structure and properties have been isolated elsewhere in the animal kingdom. A salmon natriuretic peptide known as salmon cardiac peptide has been described, and dendroaspis natriuretic peptide (DNP) has been found in the venom of the green mamba, as well as an NP in a species of African snake.

== Pharmacological modulation ==
Neutral endopeptidase (NEP) also known as neprilysin is the enzyme that metabolizes natriuretic peptides. Several inhibitors of NEP are currently being developed to treat disorders ranging from hypertension to heart failure. Most of them are dual inhibitors (NEP and ACE). In 2014, PARADIGM-HF study was published in NEJM. This study considered as a landmark study in treatment of heart failure. The study was double blinded; compared LCZ696 versus enalapril in patients with heart failure. The study showed lower all cause mortality, cardiovascular mortality and hospitalization in LCZ696 arm. Omapatrilat (dual inhibitor of NEP and angiotensin-converting enzyme) developed by BMS did not receive FDA approval due to angioedema safety concerns. Other dual inhibitors of NEP with ACE/angiotensin receptor are (in 2003) being developed by pharmaceutical companies.

== Synonyms ==
ANP is also called atrial natriuretic factor (ANF), atrial natriuretic hormone (ANH), cardionatrine, cardiodilatin (CDD), and atriopeptin.

== See also ==
- Renin-angiotensin system: When the blood flow through the juxtaglomerular apparatus decreases, blood pressure is considered low, and the adrenal cortex secretes aldosterone to increase sodium reabsorption in the collecting duct, thereby increasing blood pressure.
- Bainbridge reflex: In response to stretching of the right atrium wall, heart rate increases, lowering venous blood pressure.
- Baroreflex: When the stretch receptors in the aortic arch and carotid sinus increase, the blood pressure is considered to be elevated and the heart rate decreases to lower blood pressure.
- Antidiuretic hormone: The hypothalamus detects the extracellular fluid hyperosmolality and the posterior pituitary gland secretes antidiuretic hormone to increase water reabsorption in the collecting duct.
