= Urodilatin =

Identifiers
CAS Number	118812-69-4
3D model (JSmol)	Interactive image
ChemSpider	17289074; 11209147
KEGG	C16000
MeSH	Urodilatin
PubChem CID	16132416
UNII	740Y5J48Z8
CompTox Dashboard (EPA)	DTXSID50151238
- InChI: InChI=1S/C145H234N52O44S3/c1-11-72(6)112-137(238)171-60-106(208)172-73(7)113(214)177-86(40-41-103(146)205)122(223)190-95(63-198)116(217)170-61-108(210)175-88(51-70(2)3)114(215)169-62-109(211)176-100(133(234)187-92(56-104(147)206)127(228)193-97(65-200)130(231)186-91(54-77-27-16-13-17-28-77)126(227)180-82(31-20-45-163-142(153)154)119(220)189-94(139(240)241)55-78-36-38-79(204)39-37-78)68-243-244-69-101(134(235)185-90(53-76-25-14-12-15-26-76)115(216)168-58-105(207)167-59-107(209)174-80(29-18-43-161-140(149)150)117(218)182-87(42-50-242-10)123(224)188-93(57-110(212)213)128(229)181-85(124(225)196-112)34-23-48-166-145(159)160)195-132(233)99(67-202)194-131(232)98(66-201)192-120(221)83(32-21-46-164-143(155)156)178-118(219)81(30-19-44-162-141(151)152)179-125(226)89(52-71(4)5)184-129(230)96(64-199)191-121(222)84(33-22-47-165-144(157)158)183-135(236)102-35-24-49-197(102)138(239)74(8)173-136(237)111(148)75(9)203/h12-17,25-28,36-39,70-75,80-102,111-112,198-204H,11,18-24,29-35,40-69,148H2,1-10H3,(H2,146,205)(H2,147,206)(H,167,207)(H,168,216)(H,169,215)(H,170,217)(H,171,238)(H,172,208)(H,173,237)(H,174,209)(H,175,210)(H,176,211)(H,177,214)(H,178,219)(H,179,226)(H,180,227)(H,181,229)(H,182,218)(H,183,236)(H,184,230)(H,185,235)(H,186,231)(H,187,234)(H,188,224)(H,189,220)(H,190,223)(H,191,222)(H,192,221)(H,193,228)(H,194,232)(H,195,233)(H,196,225)(H,212,213)(H,240,241)(H4,149,150,161)(H4,151,152,162)(H4,153,154,163)(H4,155,156,164)(H4,157,158,165)(H4,159,160,166)/t72-,73-,74-,75+,80-,81-,82-,83-,84-,85-,86-,87-,88-,89-,90-,91-,92-,93-,94-,95-,96-,97-,98-,99-,100-,101-,102-,111-,112-/m0/s1
- SMILES: CCC(C)C1C(=O)NCC(=O)NC(C(=O)NC(C(=O)NC(C(=O)NCC(=O)NC(C(=O)NCC(=O)NC(CSSCC(C(=O)NC(C(=O)NCC(=O)NCC(=O)NC(C(=O)NC(C(=O)NC(C(=O)NC(C(=O)N1)CCCNC(=N)N)CC(=O)O)CCSC)CCCNC(=N)N)Cc2ccccc2)NC(=O)C(CO)NC(=O)C(CO)NC(=O)C(CCCNC(=N)N)NC(=O)C(CCCNC(=N)N)NC(=O)C(CC(C)C)NC(=O)C(CO)NC(=O)C(CCCNC(=N)N)NC(=O)C3CCCN3C(=O)C(C)NC(=O)C(C(C)O)N)C(=O)NC(CC(=O)N)C(=O)NC(CO)C(=O)NC(Cc4ccccc4)C(=O)NC(CCCNC(=N)N)C(=O)NC(Cc5ccc(cc5)O)C(=O)O)CC(C)C)CO)CCC(=O)N)C

Properties
Chemical formula	C_{145}H_{234}N_{52}O_{44}S_{3}
Molar mass	3505.926
- Except where otherwise noted, data are given for materials in their standard state (at 25 °C [77 °F], 100 kPa). Infobox references

Urodilatin (URO) is a hormone that causes natriuresis by increasing renal blood flow. It is secreted in response to increased mean arterial pressure and increased blood volume from the cells of the distal tubule and collecting duct. It is important in oliguric patients (such as those with acute kidney injury and chronic kidney failure) as it lowers serum creatinine and increases urine output.

== Interactions ==
Atrial natriuretic peptide (ANP; CDD/ANP-99-126; NPPA-124-151, 28 residues) is a hormone system of clinical importance. It is produced in the heart and excreted into the circulation via exocytosis. The endocrine heart is composed of specific myoendocrine cells that synthesize and secrete the natriuretic peptide hormones, which exhibit diuretic and vasorelaxant properties. Urodilatin (CDD/ANP-95-126; NPPA-120-151, 32 residues) is a homologue natriuretic peptide that differs from CDD/ANP-99-126 by a four-residue extension at the N-terminal end, produced by the kidney as part of a paracrine system regulating water and sodium reabsorption. It is secreted into the urine.

=== Effects ===
Research efforts since the early 1980s have studied their effects on electrolyte homeostasis. Natriuretic peptides bind to the atrial natriuretic peptide receptors, resulting in a cGMP-dependent signal transduction, which induces diuresis and natriuresis.

The potency of urodilatin equals or exceeds that of ANP. Atriopeptin is only of trivial importance in the regulation of sodium excretion during normal living conditions, unlike urodilatin which the kidney produces to control itself.

=== Metabolism ===
Neutral endopeptidase-24.11 (NEP) plays a physiological role in degrading the natriuretic peptides.

Endogenous urodilatin is little affected by renal enzymes that inactivate ANP such as NEP, as the kidney elutes with urodilatin rather than with ANP.

The degradation rates of (125I)-urodilatin and [125I]-ANP by pure recombinant NEP (rNEP) were compared. Phosphoramidon, a potent inhibitor of NEP, completely protected both peptides from metabolism by rNEP.

=== Drug development ===
When administered intravenously, urodilatin induces strong diuresis and natriuresis with tolerable hemodynamic side effects. As a consequence, urodilatin is involved in drug development along with the proANP (CDD/ANP-1-126) and mature ANP (CDD/ANP-99-126).
