= XXB 750 =

Experimental drug

XXB 750 is an experimental injected drug that targets natriuretic peptide (NPR1) and is developed to treat resistant hypertension. It was also tried for heart failure with reduced ejection fraction.
