= 8-Bromoadenosine 3',5'-cyclic monophosphate =

- Skeletal formula

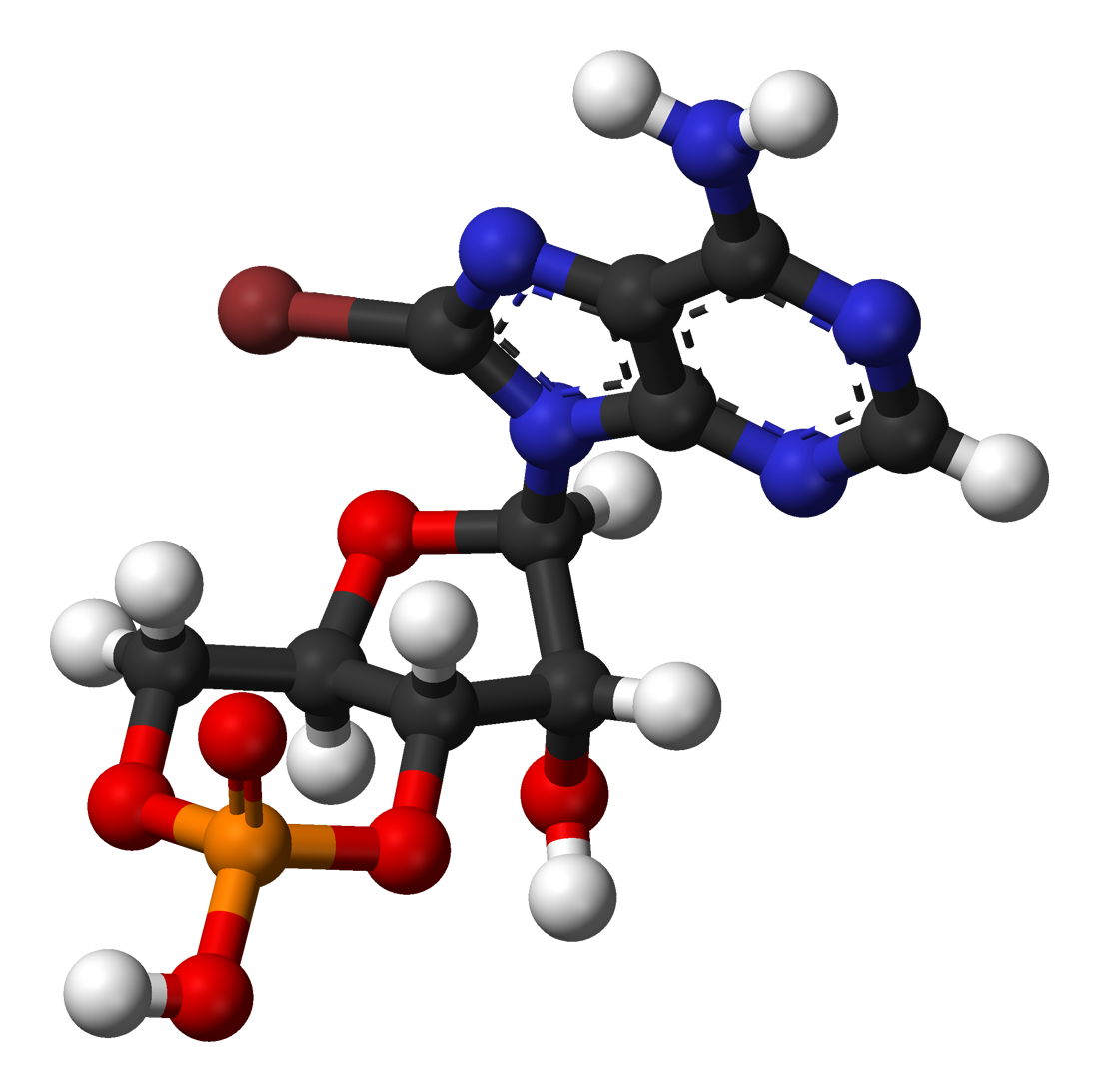
- Ball-and-stick model

Names
- IUPAC name 8-Bromoadenosine 3′,5′-(hydrogen phosphate)
- Systematic IUPAC name (4aR,6R,7R,7aS)-6-(6-Amino-8-bromo-9H-purin-9-yl)-2,7-dihydroxytetrahydro-2H,4H-2λ^{5}-furo[3,2-d][1,3,2]dioxaphosphinin-2-one
- Other names 8-Br-cAMP; BCAMP; 8-Bromo-cyclic AMP; 8-Bromo-cyclic 3',5'-AMP

Identifiers
CAS Number	23583-48-4
3D model (JSmol)	Interactive image
ChEBI	CHEBI:64211
ChEMBL	ChEMBL85519
ChemSpider	29689
ECHA InfoCard	100.041.585
PubChem CID	32014
UNII	5QO1UW05Q5
CompTox Dashboard (EPA)	DTXSID1040403
- InChI: InChI=1S/C10H11BrN5O6P/c11-10-15-4-7(12)13-2-14-8(4)16(10)9-5(17)6-3(21-9)1-20-23(18,19)22-6/h2-3,5-6,9,17H,1H2,(H,18,19)(H2,12,13,14)/t3-,5-,6-,9-/m1/s1 Key: DVKQVRZMKBDMDH-UUOKFMHZSA-N
- SMILES: Brc2nc1c(ncnc1n2[C@@H]3O[C@@H]4COP(=O)(O[C@H]4[C@H]3O)O)N

Properties
Chemical formula	C_{10}H_{11}BrN_{5}O_{6}P
Molar mass	408.105 g·mol^{−1}
- Except where otherwise noted, data are given for materials in their standard state (at 25 °C [77 °F], 100 kPa). verify (what is ?) Infobox references

8-Bromoadenosine 3',5'-cyclic adenosine monophosphate (8-Br-cAMP) is a brominated derivative of cyclic adenosine monophosphate (cAMP). 8-Br-cAMP is an activator of cyclic AMP-dependent protein kinase, and it is long-acting because it is resistant to degradation by cyclic AMP phosphodiesterase.

== See also ==
- 8-Bromoguanosine 3',5'-cyclic monophosphate (8-Br-cGMP)
