= PL-3994 =

Chemical compound

Identifiers
- CAS Number: 952295-80-6
- PubChem CID: 121488161
- UNII: YI2S0GUQ2C

Chemical and physical data
- Formula: C_{82}H_{127}N_{27}O_{20}S_{2}
- Molar mass: 1875.21 g·mol^{−1}

PL-3994 is an experimental bronchodilator that acts as an agonist of the natriuretic peptide receptor A. It is developed by Palatin Technologies.
