= NPRA =

NPRA may refer to:

- The National Petroleum Reserve in Alaska
- Norwegian Public Roads Administration
- Natriuretic peptide receptor A, a type of atrial natriuretic peptide receptor
