= Atrial volume receptors =

Stretch receptors of the heart

Atrial volume receptors (also known as Veno-atrial stretch receptors) are low pressure baroreceptors that are found in the atria of the heart. They are myelinated vagal fibres in the endocardium found at the junction between atria and the vena cava/pulmonary vein.

When these receptors detect a blood volume increase in the atria, the atrial stretch triggers the release of Atrial Natriuretic Peptide (ANP), and a signal is transmitted from the receptors to the hypothalamus in the brain. The ANP causes increased natriuresis, while the hypothalamus, in turn, decreases the production of vasopressin (also known as ADH, AVP, or arginine vasopressin). These receptors also cause a renal vasodilation, resulting in increased diuresis. This decreases the blood volume, resulting in the decrease of blood pressure.There are two types, type A is activated by atrial wall tension in atrial contraction (during the a wave of the atrial pressure curve), type B is activated by atrial stretch during atrial filling (with the v pressure wave).

They can display hysteresis.

== See also ==
- Atrial natriuretic peptide
- Angiotensin
- Bainbridge reflex
- Aldosterone
