= 8-Bromoguanosine 3',5'-cyclic monophosphate =

8-Bromoguanosine 3′,5′-cyclic monophosphate

Names
- IUPAC name 8-Bromoguanosine 3′,5′-(hydrogen phosphate)
- Preferred IUPAC name (4aR,6R,7R,7aS)-6-(2-Amino-8-bromo-6-oxo-1,6-dihydro-9H-purin-9-yl)-2,7-dihydroxytetrahydro-2H,4H-2λ^{5}-furo[3,2-d][1,3,2]dioxaphosphinin-2-one
- Other names 8-Bromocyclic GMP;8-Bromo-cGMP; 8-Br-cyclic GMP; 8-Br-cGMP

Identifiers
CAS Number	31356-94-2
3D model (JSmol)	Interactive image; Interactive image
ChEBI	CHEBI:64108
ChemSpider	94575
PubChem CID	104767
CompTox Dashboard (EPA)	DTXSID50953395
- InChI: InChI=1S/C10H11BrN5O7P/c11-9-13-3-6(14-10(12)15-7(3)18)16(9)8-4(17)5-2(22-8)1-21-24(19,20)23-5/h2,4-5,8,17H,1H2,(H,19,20)(H3,12,14,15,18)/t2-,4-,5-,8-/m1/s1 Key: YUFCOOWNNHGGOD-UMMCILCDSA-N; InChI=1/C10H11BrN5O7P/c11-9-13-3-6(14-10(12)15-7(3)18)16(9)8-4(17)5-2(22-8)1-21-24(19,20)23-5/h2,4-5,8,17H,1H2,(H,19,20)(H3,12,14,15,18)/t2-,4-,5-,8-/m1/s1 Key: YUFCOOWNNHGGOD-UMMCILCDBZ
- SMILES: C1[C@@H]2[C@H]([C@H]([C@@H](O2)N3C4=C(C(=O)N=C(N4)N)N=C3Br)O)OP(=O)(O1)O; O=C4/N=C(/N)Nc1c4nc(Br)n1[C@@H]2O[C@@H]3COP(=O)(O[C@H]3[C@H]2O)O

Properties
Chemical formula	C_{10}H_{11}BrN_{5}O_{7}P
Molar mass	424.104 g·mol^{−1}
- Except where otherwise noted, data are given for materials in their standard state (at 25 °C [77 °F], 100 kPa). verify (what is ?) Infobox references

8-Bromoguanosine 3′,5′-cyclic monophosphate is a brominated derivative of cyclic guanosine monophosphate (cGMP). It acts as an activator of cGMP-dependent protein kinases.

== See also ==
- 8-Bromoadenosine 3′,5′-cyclic monophosphate (8-Br-cAMP)
