= Jonathan Sackner-Bernstein =

American physician (born 1961)

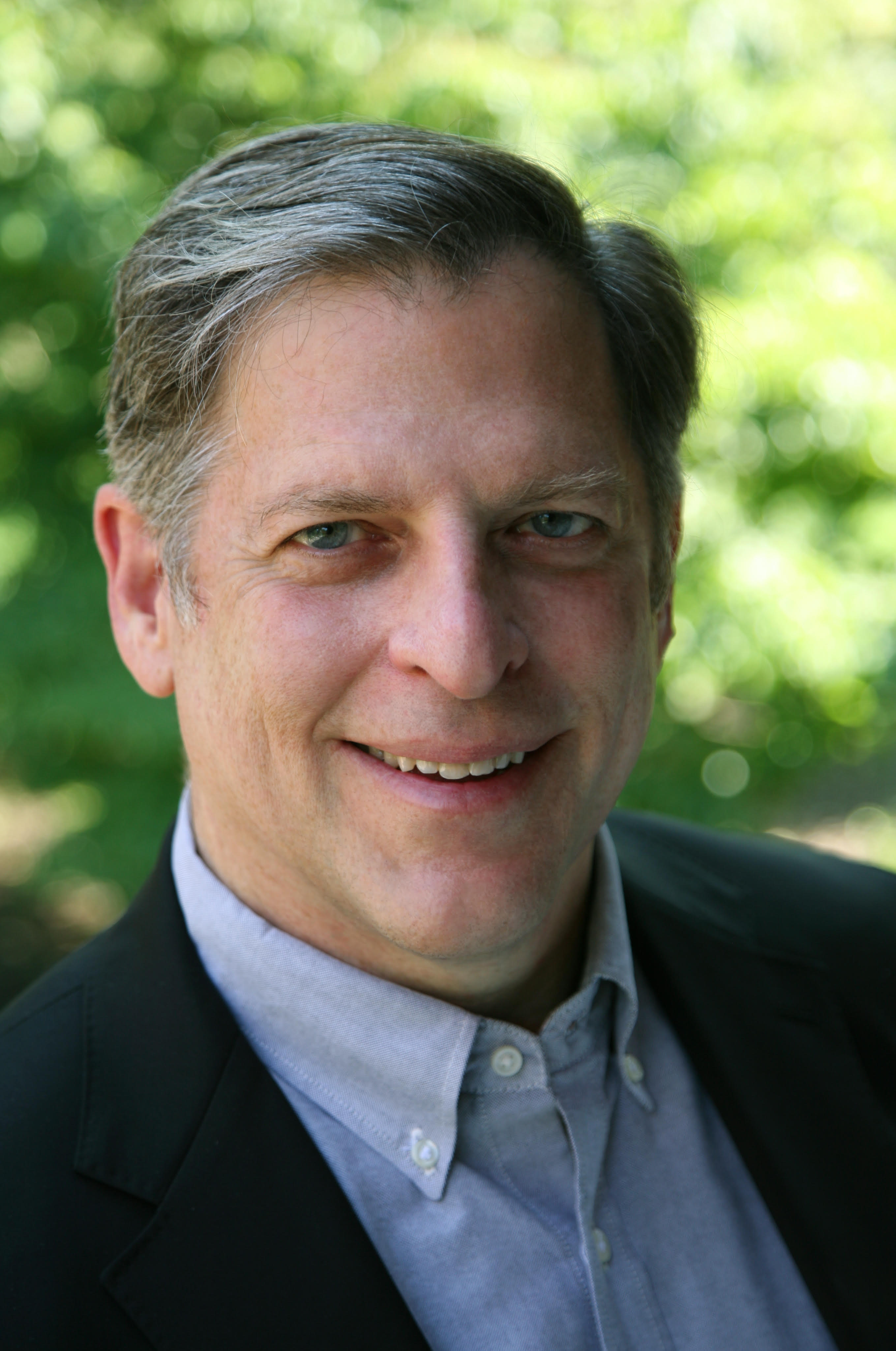
- Sackner-Bernstein in 2019
- Born: 1961 (age 64–65); Philadelphia, PA
- Education: Miami Beach Senior High School; University of Pennsylvania; Moore School of Electrical Engineering; Jefferson Medical College
- Occupation: Cardiologist
- Organization(s): Mt. Sinai Hospital; Columbia University; Food and Drug Administration; DARPA; ExVivos
- Known for: Biotech, Medtech, Clinical Research
- Spouse: Audrey S. Bernstein

Jonathan Sackner-Bernstein is an American physician. He has published around 80 scientific articles, which have been cited more than 4,000 times. His research has ranged from cardiac care to the efficacy of drugs. His research led to increased scrutiny of Nesiritide, a widely marketed drug, which led to its decline in its use.

== Education ==
Sackner-Bernstein graduated from the University of Pennsylvania's Moore School of Electrical Engineering in 1983 (BSEE),. He completed his MD from Jefferson Medical College, during which he moonlit writing code. He completed a residency in internal medicine and subsequently cardiology at Mount Sinai Hospital in New York. In addition, Sackner-Bernstein completed a research fellowship in heart failure under Milton Packer at Mount Sinai Hospital.

== Academic, clinical and research experience ==
Sackner-Bernstein joined the Columbia University faculty in 1993 in the Division of Circulatory Physiology, where he established its clinical research program. He accumulated a large experience with the beta-blocker carvedilol prior to the application by its developer (GlaxoSmithKline) to the US Food and Drug Administration (FDA).

His most cited research focused on whether the newly marketed heart failure drug nesiritide (hr-BNP, Natrecor) was safe and effective, with a call for large-scale clinical trials prior to widespread use. While nesiritide was projected to generate $1 billion in sales in 2006, these studies triggered controversy that eventually led to markedly lower use by physicians.

Other frequently cited articles include work on carvedilol and cardiac hypertrophy.

He is also the author of a book on heart disease, Before It Happens To You.

== US government projects ==
Sackner-Bernstein joined the FDA in 2008 as Associate Center Director, leading Post Market Operations as well as Technology and Innovation programs. As the Center's first Associate Center Director for Technology and Innovation, Sackner-Bernstein launched the Innovation Initiative in 2011, which subsequently led to the Early Feasibility Program and laid the foundation for the Breakthrough Device Program.

He also helped establish a formal relationship between FDA and DARPA (Defense Advanced Research Projects Agency), then serving as architect for the initial Entrepreneurs-in-Residence Program. sponsored by the White House Office of Science and Technology Policy (OSTP)

== Commercial projects ==
Sackner-Bernstein conducted the first study to estimate the amount of dopamine free in the cytosol of the dopaminergic neurons in people with Parkinson's. While confirming that tissue levels of dopamine are markedly reduced, statistical adjustments for the loss of neurons, axons and intracellular vesicles demonstrated that free dopamine levels trended higher in the caudate and were significantly elevated in the putamen. In parallel, multiple preclinical studies showed that use of a drug to reduce dopamine improved biology and function. The data suggest that the neurons that drive Parkinson's experience the disease as a state of dopamine excess - not deficiency, relevant because of potential for dopamine's break-down products causing neuronal toxicity. Sackner-Bernstein launched a company to test such a drug treatment strategy in Parkinson's.
