= NPR3 =

Protein-coding gene in humans

Identifiers
- Aliases: NPR3, ANP-C, ANPR-C, ANPRC, C5orf23, GUCY2B, NPR-C, NPRC, natriuretic peptide receptor 3, BOMOS
- External IDs: OMIM: 108962; MGI: 97373; GeneCards: NPR3
Available structures
PDB	Ortholog search: PDBe RCSB
PDB	List of PDB id codes 1JDN, 1JDP, 1YK0, 1YK1

Gene location (Human)
Chr.	Chromosome 5 (human)
Band	5p13.3	Start	32,689,070 bp
Band	5p13.3	End	32,791,724 bp

Gene location (Mouse)
Chr.	Chromosome 15 (mouse)
Band	15 A1|15 5.83 cM	Start	11,839,982 bp
Band	15 A1|15 5.83 cM	End	11,907,373 bp
RNA expression pattern
Bgee	Human / Mouse (ortholog); Top expressed in: glomerulus; metanephric glomerulus; kidney tubule; cardiac muscle tissue of right atrium; stromal cell of endometrium; renal medulla; human kidney; myocardium of left ventricle; visceral pleura; lower lobe of lung / Top expressed in: atrioventricular valve; white adipose tissue; atrium; left lung lobe; right lung lobe; Epithelium of choroid plexus; choroidal fissure; ankle; brown adipose tissue; lactiferous gland; More reference expression data
BioGPS	n/a
Gene ontology
Molecular function	hormone binding; natriuretic peptide receptor activity; G protein-coupled peptide receptor activity; protein binding; chloride ion binding; peptide binding; protein homodimerization activity; peptide hormone binding
Cellular component	integral component of membrane; membrane; integral component of plasma membrane; intracellular anatomical structure; extracellular exosome; protein-containing complex
Biological process	skeletal system development; negative regulation of smooth muscle cell proliferation; positive regulation of urine volume; pancreatic juice secretion; regulation of osteoblast proliferation; regulation of blood pressure; phospholipase C-activating G protein-coupled receptor signaling pathway; positive regulation of nitric-oxide synthase activity; phosphatidylinositol-mediated signaling; osteoclast proliferation; negative regulation of adenylate cyclase activity; adenylate cyclase-inhibiting G protein-coupled receptor signaling pathway; negative regulation of cold-induced thermogenesis
Sources:Amigo / QuickGO
Orthologs
Databases	NCBI: entry; OMA: entry
Species	Human	Mouse
Entrez	4883	18162
Ensembl	ENSG00000113389	ENSMUSG00000022206
UniProt	P17342	P70180
RefSeq (mRNA)	NM_000908; NM_001204375; NM_001204376; NM_024563; NM_001363652 NM_001364458; NM_001364460	NM_001039181; NM_001286395; NM_008728
RefSeq (protein)	NP_000899; NP_001191304; NP_001191305; NP_001350581; NP_001351387 NP_001351389	NP_001034270; NP_001273324; NP_032754
Location (UCSC)	Chr 5: 32.69 – 32.79 Mb	Chr 15: 11.84 – 11.91 Mb
PubMed search
- Wikidata
View/Edit Human	View/Edit Mouse

Natriuretic peptide receptor C/guanylate cyclase C (atrionatriuretic peptide receptor C), also known as NPR3, is an atrial natriuretic peptide receptor. In humans it is encoded by the NPR3 gene.

== Function ==
The family of natriuretic peptides elicit a number of vascular, renal, and endocrine effects that are important in the maintenance of blood pressure and extracellular fluid volume. These effects are mediated by specific binding of the peptides to cell surface receptors in the vasculature, kidney, adrenal, and brain.

== See also ==
- Atrial natriuretic peptide receptor
