= Dendroaspis natriuretic peptide =

Natriuretic peptide DNP

Identifiers
- Organism: Dendroaspis angusticeps
- Symbol: ?
- UniProt: P28374
Search for
- Structures: Swiss-model
- Domains: InterPro

Dendroaspis natriuretic peptide (DNP) is a 38-residue peptide and a member of natriuretic peptide family. It is structurally similar to the atrial natriuretic peptide (ANP), brain natriuretic peptide (BNP), and C-type natriuretic peptide (CNP) and possesses biologic properties similar to these natriuretic peptides.

DNP was originally isolated from the venom of the green mamba snake (Dendroaspis angusticeps), from which its name is derived.
