= NPR2 =

Human protein-coding gene

Identifiers
- Aliases: NPR2, AMDM, ANPRB, ANPb, ECDM, GUC2B, GUCY2B, NPRB, NPRBi, SNSK, natriuretic peptide receptor 2, GCB, AMD1, GC-B
- External IDs: OMIM: 108961; MGI: 97372; GeneCards: NPR2
Enzyme activity
EC #	BRENDA	ExPASy	KEGG	MetaCyc
4.6.1.2	↗	↗	↗	↗

Gene location (Human)
Chr.	Chromosome 9 (human)
Band	9p13.3	Start	35,791,003 bp
Band	9p13.3	End	35,809,732 bp

Gene location (Mouse)
Chr.	Chromosome 4 (mouse)
Band	4 A5|4 23.05 cM	Start	43,631,935 bp
Band	4 A5|4 23.05 cM	End	43,651,244 bp
RNA expression pattern
Bgee	Human / Mouse (ortholog); Top expressed in: right uterine tube; right hemisphere of cerebellum; anterior pituitary; canal of the cervix; ascending aorta; Descending thoracic aorta; body of uterus; stromal cell of endometrium; left uterine tube; muscle layer of sigmoid colon / Top expressed in: neural layer of retina; soleus muscle; ankle; skin of external ear; extraocular muscle; muscle of thigh; median eminence; cumulus cell; spinal ganglia; tunica media of zone of aorta; More reference expression data
BioGPS	n/a
Gene ontology
Molecular function	protein kinase activity; nucleotide binding; hormone binding; GTP binding; lyase activity; identical protein binding; phosphorus-oxygen lyase activity; ATP binding; guanylate cyclase activity; natriuretic peptide receptor activity; peptide hormone binding; protein binding; adenylate cyclase activity; peptide receptor activity
Cellular component	integral component of membrane; membrane; plasma membrane; guanylate cyclase complex, soluble; integral component of plasma membrane; intracellular anatomical structure
Biological process	negative regulation of meiotic cell cycle; regulation of cardiac conduction; intracellular signal transduction; ossification; negative regulation of oocyte maturation; cyclic nucleotide biosynthetic process; regulation of blood pressure; cGMP biosynthetic process; protein phosphorylation; cellular response to granulocyte macrophage colony-stimulating factor stimulus; bone development; receptor guanylyl cyclase signaling pathway; reproductive process; positive regulation of cGMP-mediated signaling; cGMP-mediated signaling; signal transduction
Sources:Amigo / QuickGO
Orthologs
Databases	NCBI: entry; OMA: entry
Species	Human	Mouse
Entrez	4882	230103
Ensembl	ENSG00000159899	ENSMUSG00000028469
UniProt	P20594	Q6VVW5
RefSeq (mRNA)	NM_000907; NM_003995; NM_001378923	NM_173788; NM_001355466
RefSeq (protein)	NP_003986; NP_001365852	NP_776149; NP_001342395
Location (UCSC)	Chr 9: 35.79 – 35.81 Mb	Chr 4: 43.63 – 43.65 Mb
PubMed search
- Wikidata
View/Edit Human	View/Edit Mouse

Natriuretic peptide receptor B (NPR2), also known as atrionatriuretic peptide receptor B and formerly as guanylate cyclase B, is an atrial natriuretic peptide receptor which in humans is encoded by the NPR2 gene.

A mutation in the NPR2 gene can result in achondroplasia and disproportionate dwarfism with short limbs.

== See also ==
- Atrial natriuretic peptide receptor
- Dwarfism
