= 2',3'-cyclic-nucleotide 2'-phosphodiesterase =

Class of enzymes

2′,3′-cyclic-nucleotide 2′-phosphodiesterase

Identifiers
- EC no.: 3.1.4.16
- CAS no.: 9037-18-7

Databases
- BRENDA: enzyme data
- ExPASy: NiceZyme view
- KEGG: enzyme entry
- MetaCyc: metabolic pathway
- Rhea: reactions
- PDB structures: RCSB PDB PDBe PDBsum
- Gene Ontology: AmiGO / QuickGO
Search
- PMC: articles
- PubMed: articles
- NCBI: proteins

The enzyme 2′,3′-cyclic-nucleotide 2'-phosphodiesterase (EC 3.1.4.16) catalyzes the general reaction

nucleoside 2′,3′-cyclic phosphate + H_{2}O $\rightleftharpoons$ nucleoside 3′-phosphate

For example, the enzyme characterised from Escherichia coli, 2',3'-cyclic AMP is hydrolysed to 3'-adenylic acid:

2',3'-cyclic AMP
H_{2}O
3'-adenylic acid

Similar activity has been found in preparations from Proteus mirabilis, bovine brain, and Vibrio alginolyticus.

This enzyme is a hydrolase, specifically one acting on phosphoric diester bonds. The systematic name is nucleoside-2′,3′-cyclic-phosphate 3'-nucleotidohydrolase. Other names in use include ribonucleoside 2′,3′-cyclic phosphate diesterase, 2′,3′-cyclic AMP phosphodiesterase, 2′,3′-cyclic nucleotidase, cyclic 2′,3′-nucleotide 2′-phosphodiesterase, cyclic 2′,3′-nucleotide phosphodiesterase, 2′,3′-cyclic nucleoside monophosphate phosphodiesterase, 2′,3′-cyclic AMP 2′-phosphohydrolase, cyclic phosphodiesterase:3′-nucleotidase, 2′,3′-cyclic nucleotide phosphohydrolase, 2′:3′-cyclic phosphodiesterase, and 2′:3′-cyclic nucleotide phosphodiesterase:3'-nucleotidase.
