= Natriuretic peptide precursor C =

Protein-coding gene in the species Homo sapiens

NPPC
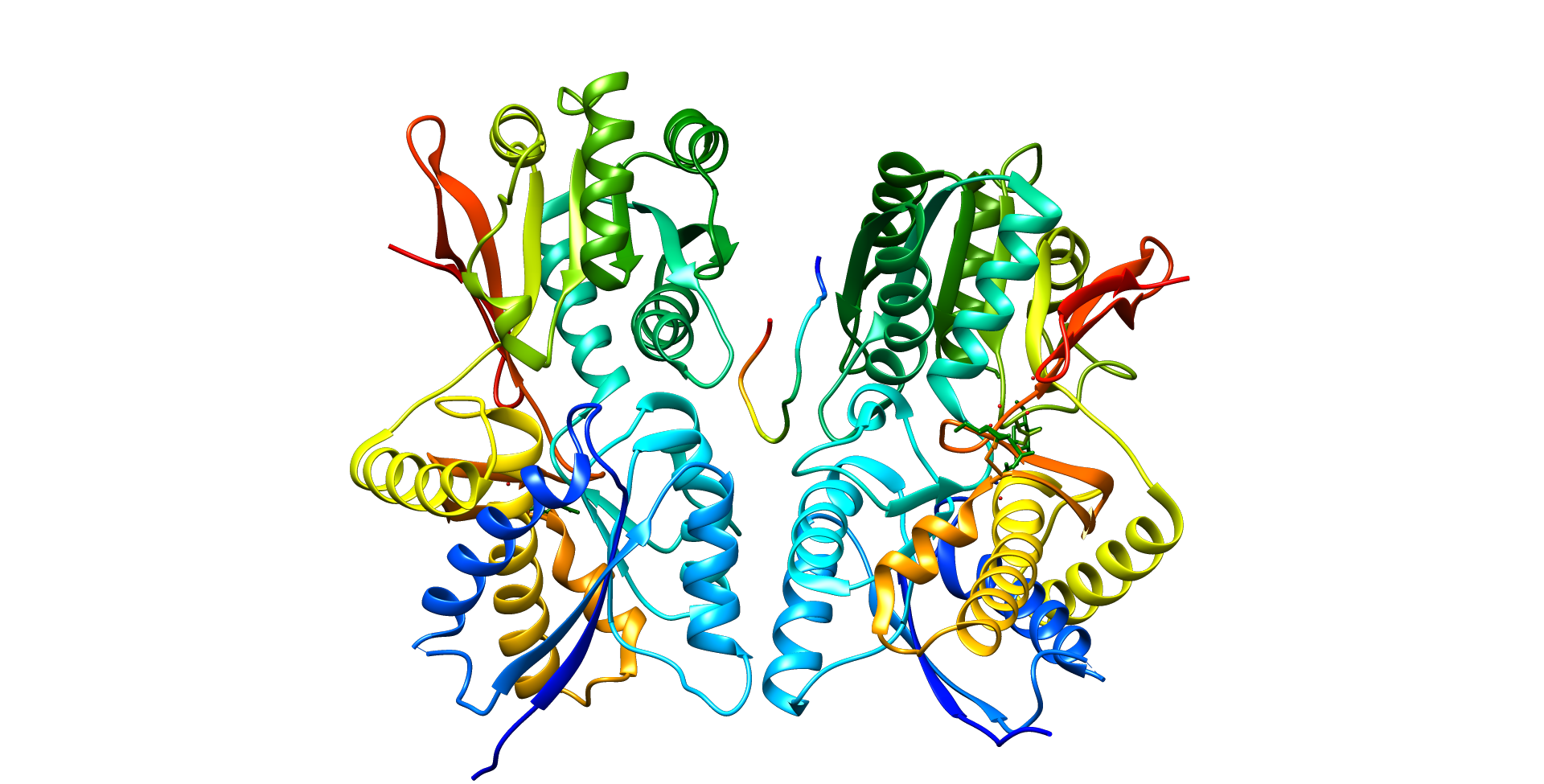

Identifiers
- Aliases: NPPC, CNP, CNP2, Natriuretic peptide precursor C, natriuretic peptide C
- External IDs: OMIM: 600296; MGI: 97369; GeneCards: NPPC
Available structures
PDB	Ortholog search: PDBe RCSB
PDB	List of PDB id codes 1JDP

Gene location (Human)
Chr.	Chromosome 2 (human)
Band	2q37.1	Start	231,921,809 bp
Band	2q37.1	End	231,926,396 bp

Gene location (Mouse)
Chr.	Chromosome 1 (mouse)
Band	1 C5|1 43.98 cM	Start	86,594,013 bp
Band	1 C5|1 43.98 cM	End	86,598,293 bp
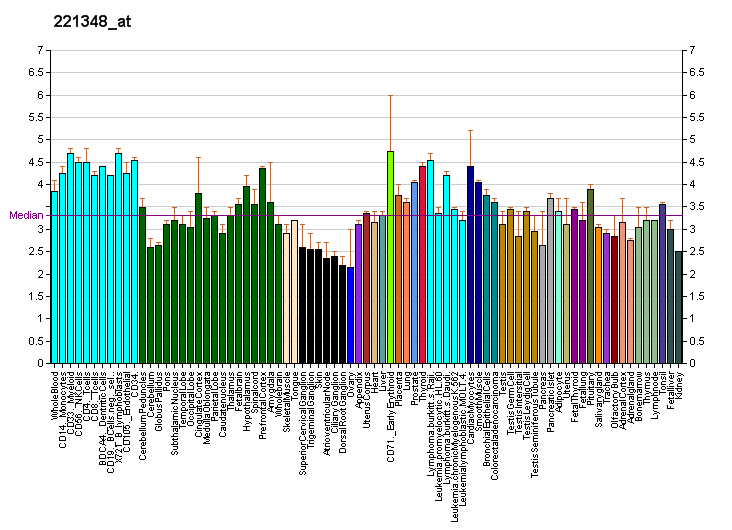
RNA expression pattern
Bgee	Human / Mouse (ortholog); Top expressed in: testicle; C1 segment; prefrontal cortex; Brodmann area 9; apex of heart; anterior cingulate cortex; right hemisphere of cerebellum; olfactory zone of nasal mucosa; left ventricle; hypothalamus / Top expressed in: lumbar subsegment of spinal cord; embryo; embryo; morula; lip; superior frontal gyrus; primary visual cortex; dentate gyrus of hippocampal formation granule cell; cumulus cell; cerebellar cortex; More reference expression data
BioGPS	More reference expression data
Gene ontology
Molecular function	protein homodimerization activity; hormone activity; peptide hormone receptor binding; signaling receptor binding; hormone receptor binding
Cellular component	secretory granule; extracellular region; extracellular space; protein-containing complex
Biological process	animal organ development; negative regulation of meiotic cell cycle; regulation of cardiac conduction; growth plate cartilage chondrocyte proliferation; response to hypoxia; ossification; regulation of multicellular organism growth; negative regulation of oocyte maturation; growth plate cartilage chondrocyte differentiation; post-embryonic development; receptor guanylyl cyclase signaling pathway; regulation of smooth muscle cell proliferation; cGMP biosynthetic process; positive regulation of osteoblast differentiation; negative regulation of DNA metabolic process; response to ethanol; negative regulation of cell population proliferation; protein folding; regulation of signaling receptor activity; reproductive process; cGMP-mediated signaling; positive regulation of cGMP-mediated signaling; negative regulation of collagen biosynthetic process; negative regulation of DNA biosynthetic process
Sources:Amigo / QuickGO
Orthologs
Databases	NCBI: entry; OMA: entry
Species	Human	Mouse
Entrez	4880	18159
Ensembl	ENSG00000163273	ENSMUSG00000026241
UniProt	P23582	Q61839
RefSeq (mRNA)	NM_024409	NM_010933
RefSeq (protein)	NP_077720	NP_035063
Location (UCSC)	Chr 2: 231.92 – 231.93 Mb	Chr 1: 86.59 – 86.6 Mb
PubMed search
- Wikidata
View/Edit Human	View/Edit Mouse

Natriuretic peptide precursor C, also known as NPPC, is a protein that in humans is encoded by the NPPC gene. The precursor NPPC protein is cleaved to the 22 amino acid peptide C-type natriuretic peptide (CNP).

== Function ==
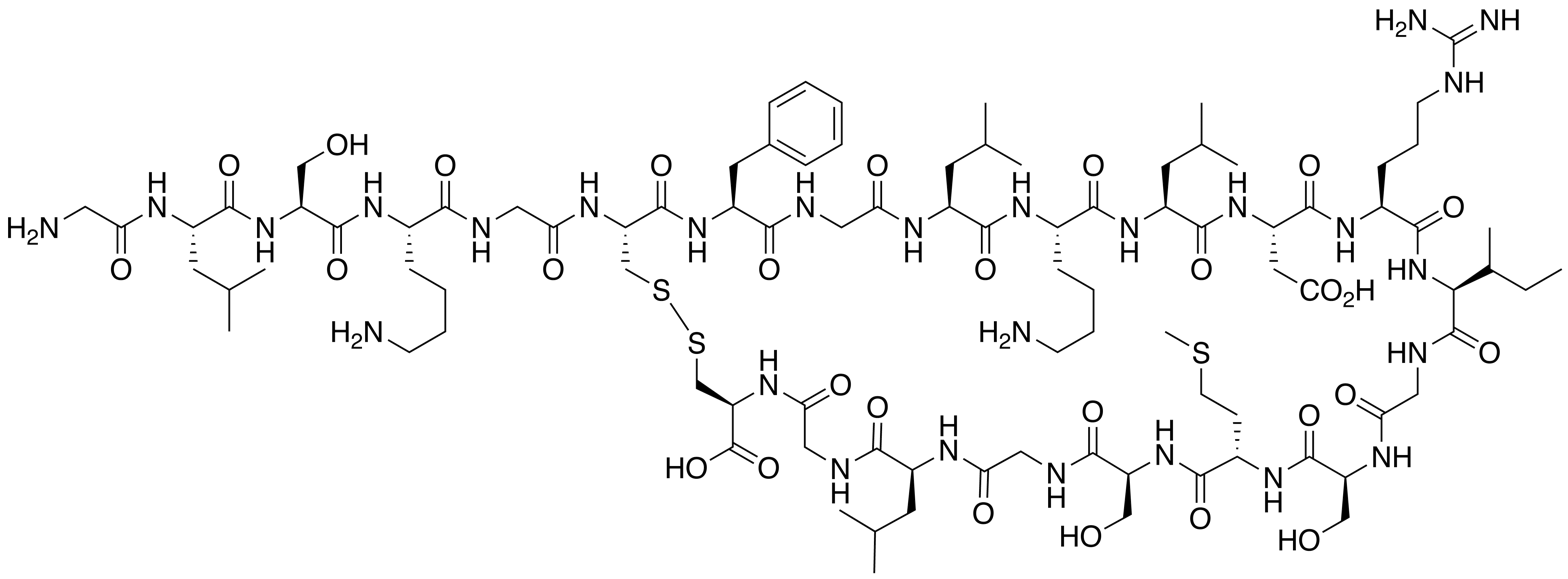
Structure of C-type natriuretic peptide (human)

Natriuretic peptides comprise a family of 3 structurally related molecules: atrial natriuretic peptide (ANP); brain natriuretic peptide (BNP); and C-type natriuretic peptide (CNP) — this type, encoded by a gene symbolized NPPC. These peptides possess potent natriuretic, diuretic, and vasodilating activities and are implicated in body fluid homeostasis and blood pressure control. Unlike ANP and BNP, CNP does not have direct natriuretic activity; this is because CNP is a selective agonist for the B-type natriuretic receptor (NPRB), whereas ANP and BNP are selective for the A-type natriuretic receptor (NPRA). CNP is synthesized and secreted from the endothelium in response to many stimuli — for example stress — similar to nitric oxide (NO) and certain proinflammatory cytokines.
