= Brain natriuretic peptide 32 =

Hormone secreted in the heart

NPPB

Identifiers
- Aliases: NPPB, natriuretic peptide B, BNP, Iso-ANP, ventricular natriuretic peptide
- External IDs: OMIM: 600295; MGI: 97368; GeneCards: NPPB
Available structures
PDB	Ortholog search: PDBe RCSB
PDB	List of PDB id codes 3N56, 1YK1

Gene location (Human)
Chr.	Chromosome 1 (human)
Band	1p36.22	Start	11,857,464 bp
Band	1p36.22	End	11,858,945 bp

Gene location (Mouse)
Chr.	Chromosome 4 (mouse)
Band	4 E1|4 78.57 cM	Start	148,070,245 bp
Band	4 E1|4 78.57 cM	End	148,071,662 bp
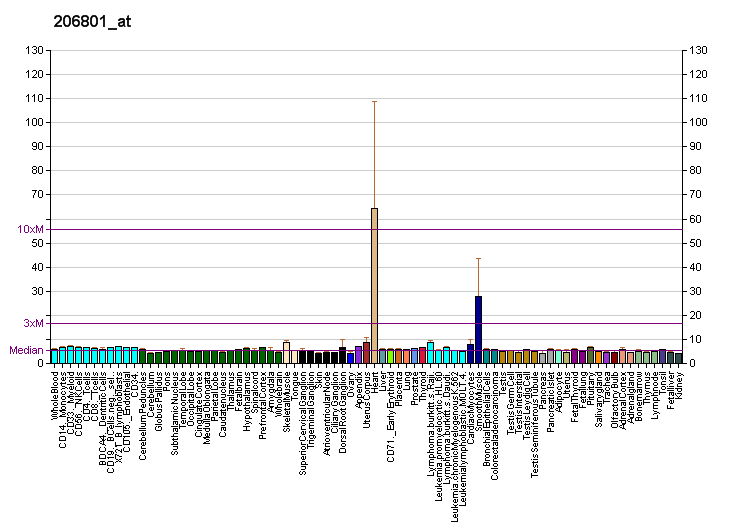
RNA expression pattern
Bgee	Human / Mouse (ortholog); Top expressed in: right auricle of heart; cardiac muscle tissue of right atrium; apex of heart; left ventricle; right ventricle; vena cava; nucleus accumbens; myocardium of left ventricle; putamen; caudate nucleus / Top expressed in: cardiac muscle tissue of left ventricle; interventricular septum; atrioventricular valve; atrium; right ventricle; endocardial cushion; lumbar spinal ganglion; decidua; morula; embryo; More reference expression data
BioGPS	More reference expression data
Gene ontology
Molecular function	protein binding; hormone activity; signaling receptor binding; diuretic hormone activity; hormone receptor binding
Cellular component	extracellular region; extracellular space; protein-containing complex; nucleus; cytoplasm
Biological process	blood vessel diameter maintenance; protein folding; regulation of signaling receptor activity; negative regulation of systemic arterial blood pressure; neuropeptide signaling pathway; cGMP-mediated signaling; regulation of blood pressure; negative regulation of angiogenesis; cell surface receptor signaling pathway; regulation of vascular permeability; receptor guanylyl cyclase signaling pathway; body fluid secretion; antimicrobial humoral immune response mediated by antimicrobial peptide; cGMP biosynthetic process; negative regulation of cell growth; positive regulation of urine volume; positive regulation of renal sodium excretion
Sources:Amigo / QuickGO
Orthologs
Databases	NCBI: entry; OMA: entry
Species	Human	Mouse
Entrez	4879	18158
Ensembl	ENSG00000120937	ENSMUSG00000029019
UniProt	P16860	P40753
RefSeq (mRNA)	NM_002521	NM_001287348; NM_008726
RefSeq (protein)	NP_002512; NP_002512	NP_001274277; NP_032752
Location (UCSC)	Chr 1: 11.86 – 11.86 Mb	Chr 4: 148.07 – 148.07 Mb
PubMed search
- Wikidata
View/Edit Human	View/Edit Mouse

Brain natriuretic peptide (BNP), also known as B-type natriuretic peptide, is a peptide hormone secreted by cardiomyocytes in the heart ventricles in response to stretching caused by increased ventricular blood volume. BNP is one of the three natriuretic peptides, in addition to atrial natriuretic peptide (ANP) and C-type natriuretic peptide (CNP). BNP was first discovered in porcine brain tissue in 1988, which led to its initial naming as "brain natriuretic peptide", although subsequent research revealed that BNP is primarily produced and secreted by the ventricular myocardium (heart muscle) in response to increased ventricular blood volume and stretching. To reflect its true source, BNP is now often referred to as "B-type natriuretic peptide" while retaining the same acronym.

The 32-amino acid polypeptide BNP-32 is secreted attached to a 76–amino acid N-terminal fragment in the prohormone called NT-proBNP (BNPT), which is biologically inactive. Once released, BNP binds to and activates the atrial natriuretic factor receptor NPRA, and to a lesser extent NPRB, in a fashion similar to atrial natriuretic peptide (ANP) but with 10-fold lower affinity. The biological half-life of BNP, however, is twice as long as that of ANP, and that of NT-proBNP is even longer, making these peptides better targets than ANP for diagnostic blood testing.

The physiologic actions of BNP are similar to those of ANP and include decrease in systemic vascular resistance and central venous pressure as well as an increase in natriuresis. The net effect of these peptides is a decrease in blood pressure due to the decrease in systemic vascular resistance and, thus, afterload. Additionally, the actions of both BNP and ANP result in a decrease in cardiac output due to an overall decrease in central venous pressure and preload as a result of the reduction in blood volume that follows natriuresis and diuresis.

== Biosynthesis ==
BNP is synthesized as a 134-amino acid preprohormone (preproBNP), encoded by the human gene NPPB. Removal of the 26-residue N-terminal signal peptide generates the prohormone, proBNP, which is stored intracellularly as an O-linked glycoprotein; proBNP is subsequently cleaved between arginine-102 and serine-103 by a specific convertase (probably furin or corin) into NT-proBNP and the biologically active 32-amino acid polypeptide BNP-32, which are secreted into the blood in equimolar amounts. Cleavage at other sites produces shorter BNP peptides with unknown biological activity. Processing of proBNP may be regulated by O-glycosylation of residues near the cleavage sites. The synthesis of BNP in cardiomyocytes is stimulated by pro-inflammatory cell factors, such as interleukin-1β, interleukin-6 and tumor necrosis factor-α.

== Physiologic effects ==
BNP decreases sodium reabsorption in the distal convoluted tubule (interaction with NCC) and cortical collecting duct of the nephron via guanosine 3',5'-cyclic monophosphate (cGMP) dependent phosphorylation of ENaC.

== Measurement ==
BNP and NT-proBNP are measured by immunoassay. Immunoassays use antibodies that bind to a specific part of the molecule to test for. Antibodies are only able to determine the amount of peptides matching their epitope fragments. They largely cannot differentiate between a cleaved part and the uncleaved precursor. For example, a BNP antibody is likely to cross-react to proBNP but not NT-proBNP.

=== Interpretation of BNP ===
==== Utility ====
- The main clinical utility of NT-proBNP is that a normal level helps to rule out chronic heart failure in the emergency setting. An elevated NT-proBNP should never be used exclusively to "rule in" acute or chronic heart failure in the emergency setting due to lack of specificity.
- Either BNP or NT-proBNP can also be used for screening and prognosis of heart failure.
- Increased NT-proBNP adjusted for age and sex and annual increase of NT-proBNP above 50% are associated with increased event rate in patients with non-severe aortic valve stenosis.
- BNP and NT-proBNP are also typically increased in patients with left ventricular dysfunction, with or without symptoms (BNP accurately reflects current ventricular status, as its half-life is 20 minutes, as opposed to 1–2 hours for NT-proBNP).

A preoperative BNP can be predictive of a risk of an acute cardiac event during vascular surgery. A cutoff of 100 pg/ml has a sensitivity of approximately 100%, a negative predictive value of approximately 100%, a specificity of 90%, and a positive predictive value of 78% according to data from the United Kingdom.

There is a diagnostic 'gray area', often defined as between 100 and 500 pg/mL, for which the test is considered inconclusive, but, in general, levels above 500 pg/ml are considered to be an indicator of heart failure. This so-called gray zone has been addressed in several studies, and using clinical history or other available simple tools can help make the diagnosis. Some laboratories report in units ng per Litre (ng/L), which is equivalent to pg/mL.

BNP has been suggested as a predictor for a variety of medical states, including cardiovascular mortality in diabetics and cardiac impairment in cancer patients.

BNP was found to have an important role in prognostication of heart surgery patients and in the emergency department. It has been shown that combining BNP with other tools like impedance cardiography (ICG) can improve early diagnosis of heart failure and advance prevention strategies. Utility of BNP has also been explored in various settings like preeclampsia, intensive care, shock and end-stage renal disease (ESRD).

NT-proBNP levels (in pg/mL) by New York Heart Association Functional Classification (NYHA functional class)
	NYHA I	NYHA II	NYHA III	NYHA IV
5th Percentile	33	103	126	148
Mean	1015	1666	3029	3465
95th Percentile	3410	6567	10,449	12,188

The BNP test is used as an aid in the diagnosis and assessment of severity of heart failure. A recent meta-analysis concerning effects of BNP testing on clinical outcomes of patients presenting to the emergency department with acute dyspnea revealed that BNP testing led to a decrease in admission rates and decrease in mean length of stay, although neither was statistically significant. Effects on all cause hospital mortality was inconclusive. The BNP test is also used for the risk stratification of patients with acute coronary syndromes.

==== Factors that affect the typical range ====
The effect or race and gender on value of BNP and its utility in that context has been studied extensively.

BNP is cleared by binding to natriuretic peptide receptors (NPRs) and neutral endopeptidase (NEP). Less than 5% of BNP is cleared renally. NT-proBNP is the inactive molecule resulting from cleavage of the prohormone Pro-BNP and is reliant solely on the kidney for excretion. The "Achilles' heel" of the NT-proBNP biomarker is the overlap in kidney disease in the heart failure patient population: kidney disease patients remove NT-proBNP slower than usual, making an elevated value hard to interpret.

When interpreting an elevated BNP level, values may be elevated due to factors other than heart failure. Lower levels are often seen in obese patients. Higher levels are seen in those with renal disease, in the absence of heart failure.

== Therapeutic application ==
Recombinant BNP, nesiritide, has been suggested as a treatment for decompensated heart failure. However, a clinical trial failed to show a benefit of nesiritide in patients with acute decompensated heart failure. Blockade of neprilysin, a protease known to degrade members of the natriuretic peptide family, has also been suggested as a possible treatment for heart failure. Dual administration of neprilysin inhibitors and angiotensin receptor blockers has been shown to be advantageous to ACE inhibitors, the current first-line therapy, in multiple settings.

== See also ==
- Peptide synthesis
