= NPR1 =

Protein found in humans

Identifiers
- Aliases: NPR1, ANPRA, ANPa, GUC2A, GUCY2A, NPRA, natriuretic peptide receptor 1
- External IDs: OMIM: 108960; MGI: 97371; GeneCards: NPR1
Enzyme activity
EC #	BRENDA	ExPASy	KEGG	MetaCyc
4.6.1.2	↗	↗	↗	↗

Gene location (Human)
Chr.	Chromosome 1 (human)
Band	1q21.3	Start	153,678,688 bp
Band	1q21.3	End	153,693,992 bp

Gene location (Mouse)
Chr.	Chromosome 3 (mouse)
Band	3 F1|3 39.23 cM	Start	90,357,898 bp
Band	3 F1|3 39.23 cM	End	90,373,173 bp
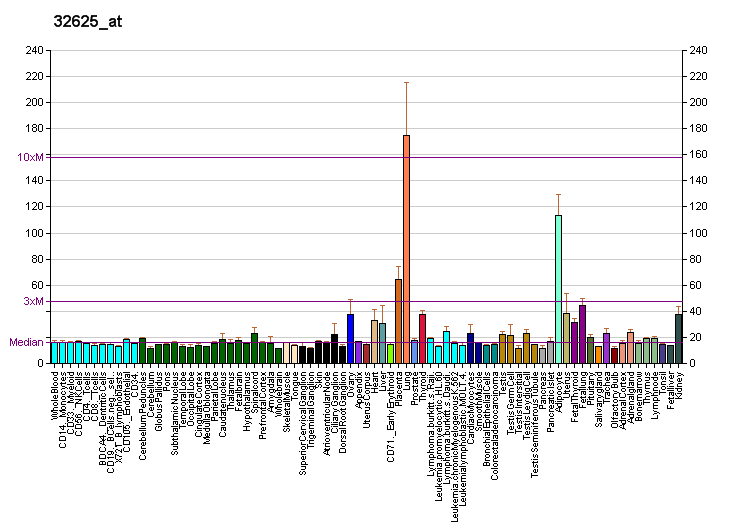

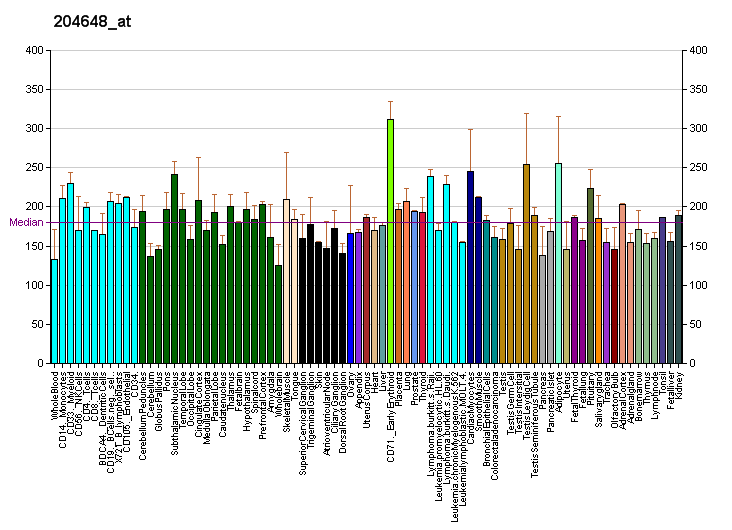
RNA expression pattern
Bgee	Human / Mouse (ortholog); Top expressed in: Descending thoracic aorta; ascending aorta; right uterine tube; gastric mucosa; left uterine tube; right coronary artery; left coronary artery; subcutaneous adipose tissue; right lung; triceps brachii muscle / Top expressed in: yolk sac; spermatocyte; muscle of thigh; blastocyst; morula; adrenal gland; lip; esophagus; thyroid gland; dentate gyrus of hippocampal formation granule cell; More reference expression data
BioGPS	More reference expression data
Gene ontology
Molecular function	protein kinase activity; nucleotide binding; G protein-coupled peptide receptor activity; hormone binding; guanylate cyclase activity; GTP binding; lyase activity; natriuretic peptide receptor activity; phosphorus-oxygen lyase activity; ATP binding; peptide hormone binding; adenylate cyclase activity; protein kinase binding; peptide receptor activity
Cellular component	integral component of membrane; membrane; plasma membrane; receptor complex; guanylate cyclase complex, soluble; intracellular anatomical structure
Biological process	negative regulation of smooth muscle cell proliferation; regulation of cardiac conduction; intracellular signal transduction; positive regulation of renal sodium excretion; positive regulation of urine volume; body fluid secretion; cyclic nucleotide biosynthetic process; receptor guanylyl cyclase signaling pathway; regulation of blood pressure; cGMP biosynthetic process; protein phosphorylation; cell surface receptor signaling pathway; regulation of vascular permeability; dopamine metabolic process; negative regulation of cell growth; negative regulation of angiogenesis; G protein-coupled receptor signaling pathway; blood vessel diameter maintenance; positive regulation of cGMP-mediated signaling; cGMP-mediated signaling; signal transduction
Sources:Amigo / QuickGO
Orthologs
Databases	NCBI: entry; OMA: entry
Species	Human	Mouse
Entrez	4881	18160
Ensembl	ENSG00000169418	ENSMUSG00000027931
UniProt	P16066	P18293
RefSeq (mRNA)	NM_000906	NM_008727
RefSeq (protein)	NP_000897	NP_032753
Location (UCSC)	Chr 1: 153.68 – 153.69 Mb	Chr 3: 90.36 – 90.37 Mb
PubMed search
- Wikidata
View/Edit Human	View/Edit Mouse

Natriuretic peptide receptor A/guanylate cyclase A (atrionatriuretic peptide receptor A), also known as NPR1, is an atrial natriuretic peptide receptor. In humans it is encoded by the NPR1 gene.

== Function ==
NPR1 is a membrane-bound guanylate cyclase that serves as the receptor for both atrial and brain natriuretic peptides (ANP and BNP, respectively).

It is localized in the kidney where it results in natriuresis upon binding to natriuretic peptides. However, it is found in even greater quantity in the lungs and adipocytes.

== See also ==
- Atrial natriuretic peptide receptor
