= N-terminal prohormone of brain natriuretic peptide =

Precursor of a hormone

natriuretic peptide B

Identifiers
- Symbol: NPPB
- NCBI gene: 4879
- HGNC: 7940
- OMIM: 600295
- RefSeq: NM_002521
- UniProt: P16860

Other data
- Locus: Chr. 1 p36.2
Search for
- Structures: Swiss-model
- Domains: InterPro

N-terminal prohormone of brain natriuretic peptide (NT-proBNP or BNPT) is a 76 amino acid long protein that is cleaved from the N-terminal end of the 108 amino acid long prohormone proBNP to release brain natriuretic peptide 32 (BNP, also known as B-type natriuretic peptide). The human version consists of residue number 27–102 of preproBNP the product of the NPPB gene.

Both BNP and NT-proBNP levels in the blood are used for screening, diagnosis of acute congestive heart failure (CHF) and may be useful to establish prognosis in heart failure, as both markers are typically higher in patients with worse outcome. The plasma concentrations of both BNP and NT-proBNP are also typically increased in patients with asymptomatic or symptomatic left ventricular dysfunction and is associated with coronary artery disease, myocardial ischemia, and severity of aortic valve stenosis.

== Blood levels ==
Upper limit (95th percentile) of blood ranges for NT-proBNP in healthy people
Sex	Age	Limit in pg/mL
Male	19-44 yrs	93
Male	45-54 yrs	138
Male	55-64 yrs	177
Male	65-74 yrs	229
Male	> 75 yrs	852
Females	19-44 yrs	178
Females	45-54 yrs	192
Females	55-64 yrs	226
Females	65-74 yrs	353
Females	> 75 yrs	624

Interpretation	Age	Range
Congestive heart failure likely	< 75 years	> 125 pg/mL
Congestive heart failure likely	> 75 years	> 450pg/mL

There is no level of BNP that perfectly separates patients with and without heart failure.

In screening for congenital heart disease in pediatric patients, an NT-proBNP cut-off value of 91 pg/mL could differentiate an acyanotic heart disease (ACNHD) patient from a healthy patient with a sensitivity of 84% and specificity of 42%. On the other hand, an NT-proBNP cut-off value of 318 pg/mL is more appropriate in differing patients with congenital nonspherocytic hemolytic disease (CNHD) from healthy patients, with 94% sensitivity and 97% specificity. An NT-proBNP value of 408 pg/mL has been estimated to be 83% sensitive and 57% specific in differentiating patients with ACNHD from patients with CNHD. In patients with non-severe asymptomatic aortic valve stenosis, increased age- and sex adjusted NT-proBNP levels alone and combined with a 50% or greater increase from baseline had been found associated with increased event rates of aortic valve stenosis related events (cardiovascular death, hospitalization with heart failure due to progression of aortic valve stenosis, or aortic valve replacement surgery). In severe aortic valve stenosis, NT-proBNP provide important prognostic information beyond clinical and echocardiographic evaluation. Recent studies have found associations between long-term excessive variation in blood pressure and elevations in NT-proBNP levels.

== Test usage in a clinical setting ==
=== Canada ===
While discussed in Canadian medical journals in the mid to late 2000s, the test is not widely used. It was only approved for use in Alberta in February 2012.

== Test usage in the life insurance industry ==
The test has been widely used in the life insurance industry to screen applicants as part of the routine requirements when applying for a life insurance policy. It is also inexpensive and can be measured from blood samples routinely drawn as part of the application process. The test can be used to evaluate for a number of health conditions.

== See also ==
- Brain natriuretic peptide
