= Atrial natriuretic peptide receptor =

Receptor for atrial natriuretic peptide

An atrial natriuretic peptide receptor is a receptor for atrial natriuretic peptide.

== Mechanism ==
NPRA and NPRB are linked to guanylyl cyclases, while NPRC is G-protein-linked and is a "clearance receptor" that acts to internalise and destroy the ligand.

ANP activation of the ANP catalytic receptor will stimulate its intracellular guanylyl cyclase activity to convert GTP to cGMP. cGMP will then stimulate cGMP-dependent protein kinase (PKG), which will then induce smooth muscle relaxation. This is particularly important in the vasculature, where vascular smooth muscle will bind ANP released as a result of increasing right atrial pressure and will cause the walls of the vasculature to relax. This relaxation will decrease total peripheral resistance, which will in turn decrease venous return to the heart. The decrease in venous return to the heart will reduce the preload and will result in the heart's having to do less work.

There is also a soluble guanylyl cyclase that cannot be stimulated by ANP. Instead, vascular endothelial cells will use L-arginine to make nitric oxide via nitric oxide synthase. The nitric oxide will then diffuse into the vascular smooth muscle and will activate the soluble guanylyl cyclase. The subsequent increase in cGMP will cause vasodilation with the same effects as described above. This is why nitroglycerine is given to a person having a heart attack. The nitroglycerine will be metabolized to nitric oxide, which will stimulate soluble guanylyl cyclase. This will result in a decrease in total peripheral resistance and a decrease in preload on the heart. As a result, work done by the heart will decrease and will allow the heart to contract less strongly. Weaker contractions will lead to more blood flow in the coronary arteries, which will help the ischemic cardiac myocytes.

== Types ==
There are three distinct atrial natriuretic factor receptors identified so far in mammals: natriuretic peptide receptors 1, 2, and 3.

natriuretic peptide receptor A/ guanylate cyclase A (atrionatriuretic peptide receptor A)

Identifiers
- Symbol: NPR1
- Alt. symbols: ANPRA, NPRA
- NCBI gene: 4881
- HGNC: 7943
- OMIM: 108960
- RefSeq: NM_000906
- UniProt: P16066

Other data
- Locus: Chr. 1 q21-q22
Search for
- Structures: Swiss-model
- Domains: InterPro

natriuretic peptide receptor B/ guanylate cyclase B (atrionatriuretic peptide receptor B)

Identifiers
- Symbol: NPR2
- Alt. symbols: ANPRB, NPRB
- NCBI gene: 4882
- HGNC: 7944
- OMIM: 108961
- RefSeq: NM_003995
- UniProt: P20594

Other data
- Locus: Chr. 9 p21-p12
Search for
- Structures: Swiss-model
- Domains: InterPro

natriuretic peptide receptor C/ guanylate cyclase C (atrionatriuretic peptide receptor C)

Identifiers
- Symbol: NPR3
- Alt. symbols: ANPRC, NPRC
- NCBI gene: 4883
- HGNC: 7945
- OMIM: 108962
- RefSeq: NM_000908
- UniProt: P17342

Other data
- Locus: Chr. 5 p14-p1
Search for
- Structures: Swiss-model
- Domains: InterPro
