= Cyclic guanosine monophosphate =

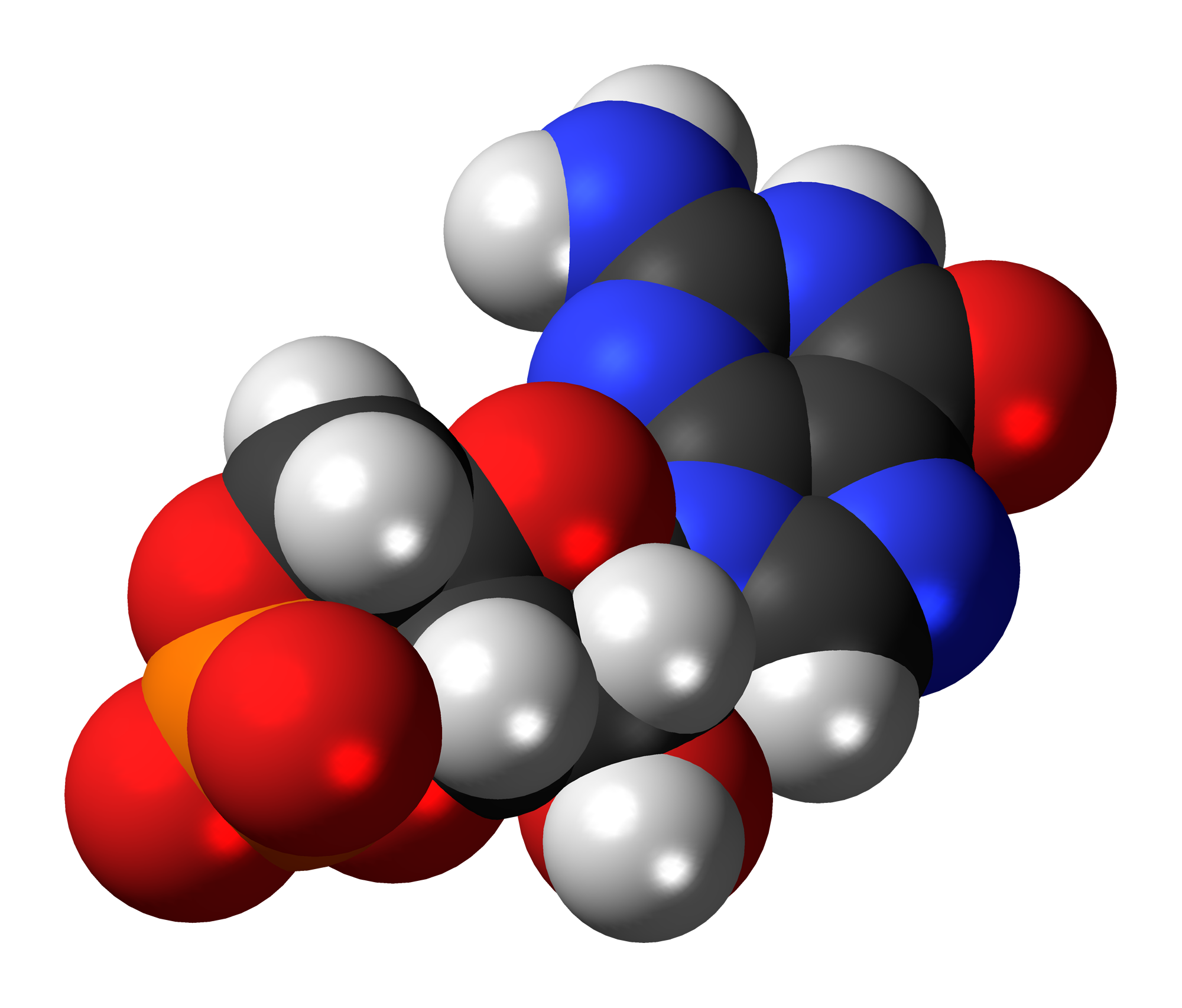

Names
- IUPAC name Guanosine 3′,5′-(hydrogen phosphate)
- Systematic IUPAC name 2-Amino-9-[(4aR,6R,7R,7aS)-2,7-dihydroxy-2-oxotetrahydro-2H,4H-2λ^{5}-furo[3,2-d][1,3,2]dioxaphosphol-6-yl]-3,9-dihydro-6H-purin-6-one
- Other names cGMP; 3′,5′-cyclic GMP; 3′:5′-cyclic GMP; Guanosine cyclic monophosphate; Cyclic 3′,5′-GMP; Guanosine 3′,5′-cyclic phosphate

Identifiers
CAS Number	7665-99-8
3D model (JSmol)	Interactive image
ChEBI	CHEBI:16356
ChEMBL	ChEMBL395336
ChemSpider	22734
ECHA InfoCard	100.028.765
IUPHAR/BPS	2347
MeSH	Cyclic+GMP
PubChem CID	24316
UNII	H2D2X058MU
CompTox Dashboard (EPA)	DTXSID8040646
- InChI: InChI=1S/C10H12N5O7P/c11-10-13-7-4(8(17)14-10)12-2-15(7)9-5(16)6-3(21-9)1-20-23(18,19)22-6/h2-3,5-6,9,16H,1H2,(H,18,19)(H3,11,13,14,17)/t3-,5-,6-,9-/m1/s1 Key: ZOOGRGPOEVQQDX-UUOKFMHZSA-N; InChI=1/C10H12N5O7P/c11-10-13-7-4(8(17)14-10)12-2-15(7)9-5(16)6-3(21-9)1-20-23(18,19)22-6/h2-3,5-6,9,16H,1H2,(H,18,19)(H3,11,13,14,17)/t3-,5-,6-,9-/m1/s1 Key: ZOOGRGPOEVQQDX-UUOKFMHZBB
- SMILES: O=C4/N=C(/N)Nc1c4ncn1[C@@H]2O[C@@H]3COP(=O)(O[C@H]3[C@H]2O)O

Properties
Chemical formula	C_{10}H_{12}N_{5}O_{7}P
Molar mass	345.208 g·mol^{−1}
- Except where otherwise noted, data are given for materials in their standard state (at 25 °C [77 °F], 100 kPa). verify (what is ?) Infobox references

Cyclic guanosine monophosphate (cGMP) is a cyclic nucleotide derived from guanosine triphosphate (GTP). cGMP acts as a second messenger much like cyclic AMP. Its most likely mechanism of action is activation of intracellular protein kinases in response to the binding of membrane-impermeable peptide hormones to the external cell surface. Through protein kinases activation, cGMP can relax smooth muscle. cGMP concentration in urine can be measured for kidney function and diabetes detection.

== History ==
Cyclic guanosine monophosphate (cGMP) research began after cGMP and cyclic adenosine monophosphate (cAMP) were identified as cellular components and potentially involved with cellular regulation. Upon the synthesis of cGMP in 1960, progress rapidly spread in the understanding of regulation and effects of cGMP. Earl W. Sutherland received the 1971 Nobel Prize in Medicine for his work with cAMP and secondary messengers. This award sparked extensive research into cAMP, while cGMP received less attention, with its biological functions largely unknown until the 1980s. During this period, two pivotal discoveries highlighted cGMP's role in cellular signaling: atrial natriuretic peptide (ANP) was found to stimulate cGMP synthesis through the particulate guanylyl cyclase (pGC) receptor, and nitric oxide (NO), identified as the endothelium-derived relaxing factor, was shown to activate soluble guanylyl cyclase (sGC), producing cGMP to mediate vasodilation in smooth muscle cells. Further components involved with the cGMP were also identified such as cGMP-hydrolyzing phosphodiesterases (PDEs) and cGMP-binding proteins. The awarding of the 1998 Nobel Prize to Robert F. Furchgott, Louis J. Ignarro, and Ferid Murad for their discoveries in the NO-cGMP pathway renewed interest in cGMP research with the 1st International Conference on cGMP being held in 2003.

== Synthesis ==
Guanylate cyclase (GC) catalyzes cGMP synthesis. This enzyme converts GTP to cGMP. Peptide hormones such as the atrial natriuretic factor activate membrane-bound GC, while soluble GC (sGC) is typically activated by nitric oxide to stimulate cGMP synthesis. sGC can be inhibited by ODQ (1H-[1,2,4]oxadiazolo[4,3-a]quinoxalin-1-one).

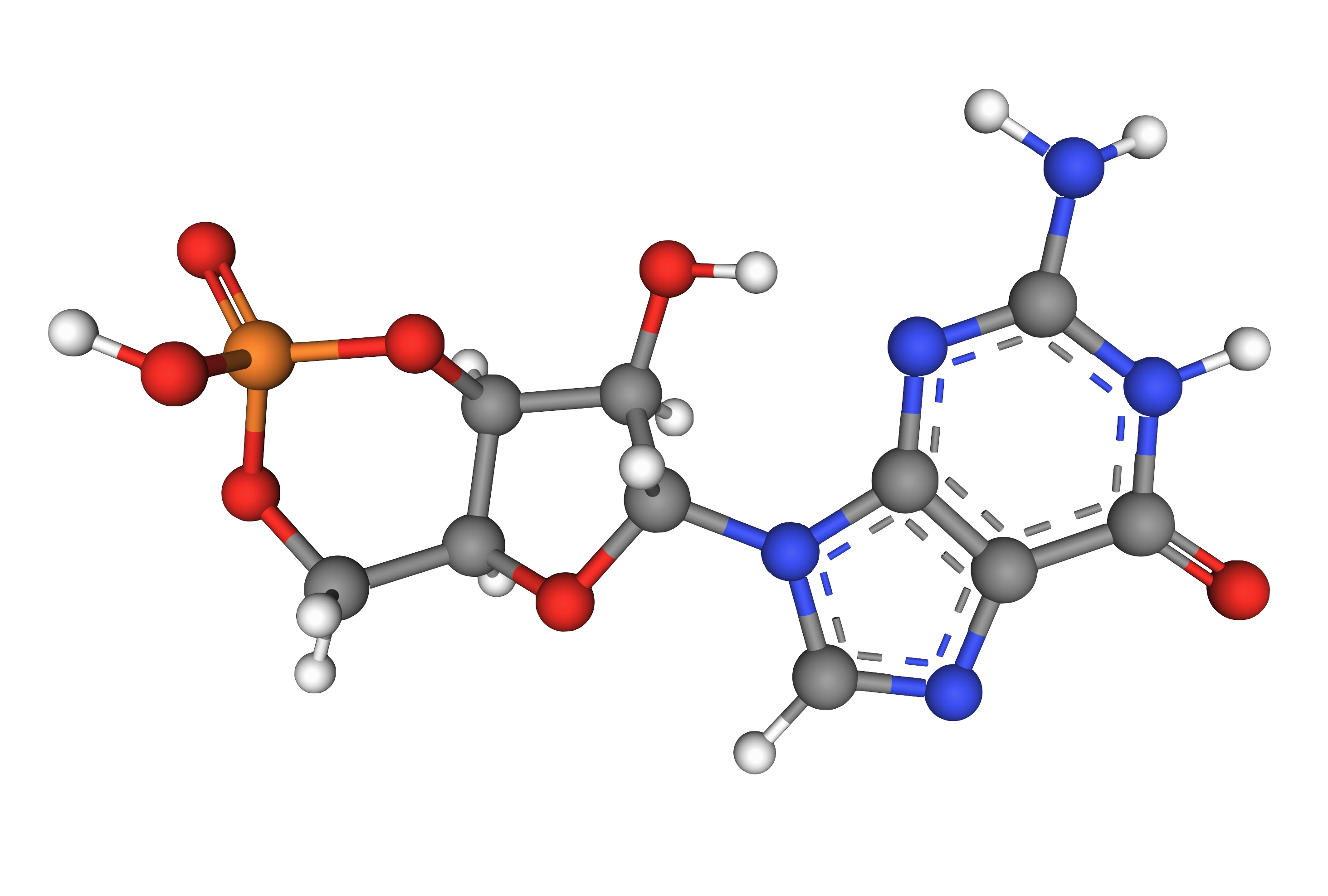
Ball and Stick model of the cyclic guanosine monophosphate molecule, Color code: Carbon, C: black Hydrogen, H: white Oxygen, O: red Nitrogen, N: blue Phosphorus, P: orange.

== Functions ==
cGMP acts as a regulator of ion channel conductance, glycogenolysis, cellular apoptosis, and platelet inhibition. cGMP relaxes smooth muscle tissue leading to vasodilation which increases blood flow. Additionally, cGMP is involved with neurogenesis and neuroplasticity. At presynaptic terminals in the striatum, cGMP controls the efficacy of neurotransmitter release.

cGMP is a secondary messenger in phototransduction in the eye. In the photoreceptors of the mammalian eye, the presence of light activates phosphodiesterase, which degrades cGMP. The sodium ion channels in photoreceptors are cGMP-gated, so degradation of cGMP causes sodium channels to close, which leads to the hyperpolarization of the photoreceptor's plasma membrane and ultimately to visual information being sent to the brain.

cGMP is also seen to mediate the switching on of the attraction of apical dendrites of pyramidal cells in cortical layer V towards semaphorin-3A (Sema3a). Whereas the axons of pyramidal cells are repelled by Sema3a, the apical dendrites are attracted to it. The attraction is mediated by the increased levels of soluble guanylate cyclase (sGC) that are present in the apical dendrites. sGC generates cGMP, leading to a sequence of chemical activations that result in the attraction towards Sema3a. The absence of sGC in the axon causes the repulsion from Sema3a. This strategy ensures the structural polarization of pyramidal neurons and takes place in embryonic development.

cGMP, like cAMP, gets synthesized when olfactory receptors receive odorous input. cGMP is produced slowly and has a more sustained life than cAMP, which has implicated it in long-term cellular responses to odor stimulation, such as long-term potentiation. cGMP in the olfactory is synthesized by both membrane guanylyl cyclase (mGC) as well as soluble guanylyl cyclase (sGC). Studies have found that cGMP synthesis in the olfactory is due to sGC activation by nitric oxide, a neurotransmitter. cGMP also requires increased intracellular levels of cAMP and the link between the two second messengers appears to be due to rising intracellular calcium levels.

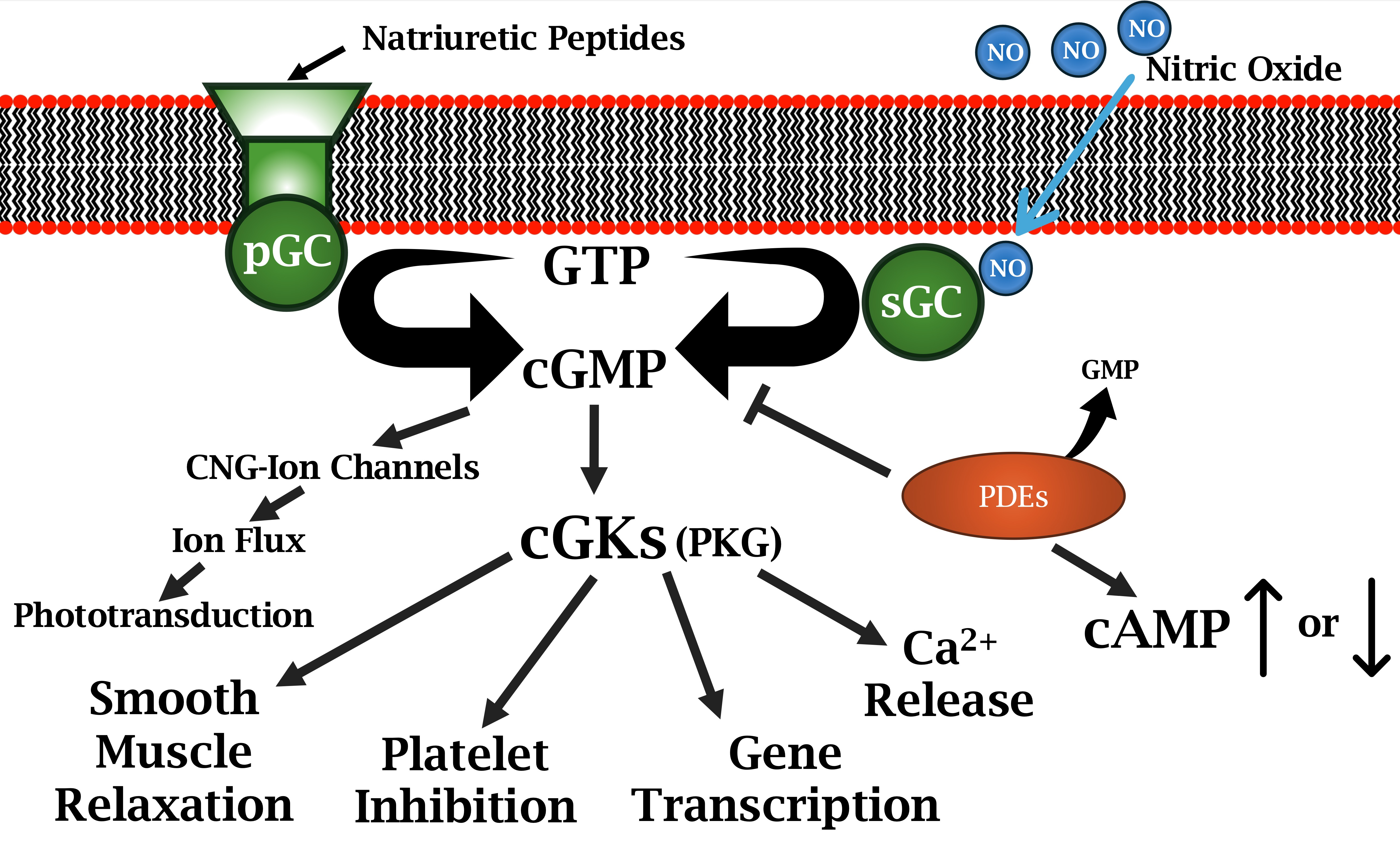
Schematic of cGMP and a broad overview of its effects

== Pathology ==
=== Role in Cardiovascular Events ===
The nitric oxide (NO)-cyclic guanosine monophosphate (cGMP)-phosphodiesterase (PDE) pathway has become a target in developing treatments for heart failure. A deficit in cGMP levels has been associated with adverse cardiovascular outcomes, promoting factors like myocardial fibrosis, vasoconstriction, and inflammation, all of which accelerate heart failure progression. Some soluble guanylate cyclase (sGC) stimulators, have yielded promising outcomes in reducing cardiovascular events. Their effectiveness is thought to result from increased sensitivity of sGC to endogenous NO.

Elevated plasma cGMP levels, regulated predominantly by natriuretic peptides (NP) rather than nitric oxide (NO), were found to correlate with a higher risk of heart failure, atherosclerotic cardiovascular disease, and coronary heart disease.

=== Role in Major Depression Disorder ===
The cGMP signaling pathway plays a role in the regulation of neuroplasticity, an area of interest in understanding the pathophysiology of major depressive disorder (MDD). The cGMP signaling pathway in the brain operates as a second messenger system, amplifying neurotransmitter signals, influencing gene expression and neuronal function. Within neurons, cGMP levels are modulated by guanylate cyclase enzymes, which synthesize cGMP, and by PDEs, which degrade cGMP.

Enhancing cGMP levels, either by stimulating guanylate cyclase or inhibiting PDEs, promotes neurogenesis and synaptic plasticity, particularly in brain regions implicated in MDD, such as the hippocampus and prefrontal cortex. Animal studies also demonstrate that chronic antidepressant treatment can elevate cGMP levels in these areas. Genetic research has further highlighted specific polymorphisms in PDE genes associated with MDD susceptibility and treatment response.

=== Role in Infectious Disease Pathogenesis ===
Certain pathogens, such as Enterotoxigenic Escherichia coli (ETEC), elevate cGMP to evade host immune defenses and establish infection. ETEC's heat-stable toxin induces significant cGMP production within intestinal epithelial cells, and this cGMP is often secreted into the extracellular space, where it serves as a signaling molecule. Extracellular cGMP, in turn, triggers the release of IL-33 release which modulate inflammation and impact the immune system's ability to mount effective responses, dampening both innate and adaptive immunity.

== Degradation ==
Numerous cyclic nucleotide phosphodiesterases (PDE) can degrade cGMP by hydrolyzing cGMP into 5'-GMP. PDE 5, -6 and -9 are cGMP-specific while PDE1, -2, -3, -10 and -11 can hydrolyse both cAMP and cGMP.

Phosphodiesterase inhibitors prevent the degradation of cGMP, thereby enhancing and/or prolonging its effects. For example, Sildenafil (Viagra) and similar drugs enhance the vasodilatory effects of cGMP within the corpus cavernosum by inhibiting PDE 5 (or PDE V). This is used as a treatment for erectile dysfunction. However, the drug can inhibit PDE6 in retina (albeit with less affinity than PDE5). This has been shown to result in loss of visual sensitivity but is unlikely to impair common visual tasks, except under conditions of reduced visibility when objects are already near visual threshold. This effect is largely avoided by other PDE5 inhibitors, such as tadalafil.

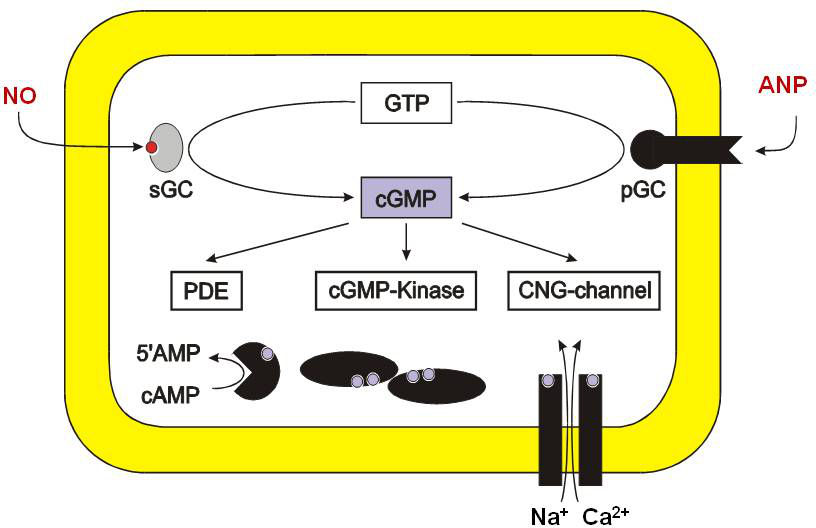
role of PKG in cellular system

== Protein kinase activation ==
The cGMP-dependent protein kinase (PKG) activation pathway begins with the production of cGMP by guanylyl cyclase enzymes, which can be activated by signaling molecules such as nitric oxide (NO) or natriuretic peptides. Elevated cGMP levels then lead to the activation of some protein-dependent kinases like PKG. For example, PKG (protein kinase G) is a dimer consisting of one catalytic and one regulatory unit, with the regulatory units blocking the active sites of the catalytic units.

cGMP binds to sites on the regulatory units of PKG and activates the catalytic units, enabling them to phosphorylate their substrates. Unlike with the activation of some other protein kinases, notably PKA, the PKG is activated but the catalytic and regulatory units do not disassociate.

Once activated, PKG phosphorylates various target proteins, altering their function and contributing to cellular processes such as smooth muscle relaxation, ion channel regulation, and inhibition of platelet aggregation. This pathway is also significant in cardiovascular physiology, where it helps maintain vascular tone and blood pressure.

== See also ==
- Cyclic adenosine monophosphate (cAMP)
- 8-Bromoguanosine 3',5'-cyclic monophosphate (8-Br-cGMP)
- Guanosine triphosphate (GTP)
- Guanylate cyclase
- Protein Kinase G
