= Natriuresis =

Excretion of sodium through urine

Natriuresis is the process of sodium excretion in the urine through the action of the kidneys. It is promoted by ventricular and atrial natriuretic peptides as well as calcitonin, and inhibited by chemicals such as aldosterone. Natriuresis lowers the concentration of sodium in the blood and also tends to lower blood volume because osmotic forces drag water out of the body's blood circulation and into the urine along with the sodium. Many diuretic drugs take advantage of this mechanism to treat medical conditions like hypernatremia and hypertension, which involve excess blood volume.

Excess natriuresis can be caused by:

- Medullary cystic disease
- Bartter syndrome
- Diuretic phase of acute tubular necrosis
- Some diuretics
- Primary renal diseases
- Congenital adrenal hyperplasia
- Syndrome of inappropriate antidiuretic hormone hypersecretion

Endogenous natriuretic hormones include:

- Atrial natriuretic peptide
- Brain natriuretic peptide
- C-type natriuretic peptide

This is a natural process in infants at the time of birth.
