= Function =

Function or functionality may refer to:

== Computing ==
- Function key, a type of key on computer keyboards
- Function model, a structured representation of processes in a system
- Function object or functor or functionoid, a concept of object-oriented programming
- Function (computer programming), a callable sequence of instructions
- Boolean function, used in hardware design

== Music ==
- Function (music), a relationship of a chord to a tonal centre
- Function (musician) (born 1973), David Charles Sumner, American techno DJ and producer
- "Function" (song), a 2012 song by American rapper E-40 featuring YG, Iamsu! & Problem
- "Function", song by Dana Kletter from Boneyard Beach 1995
- "Function", a song by OsamaSon from Psykotic

== Other uses ==
- Function (biology), the effect of an activity or process
- Function (engineering), a specific action that a system can perform
- Function (language), a way of achieving an aim using language
- Function (mathematics), a relation that associates an input to a single output
- Function (sociology), an activity's role in society
- Functionality (chemistry), the presence of functional groups in a molecule
- Party or function, a social event
- Function Drinks, an American beverage company
- Function Health, an American health technology company

== See also ==
- Function field (disambiguation)
- Function hall
- Functional (disambiguation)
- Functional group (disambiguation)
- Functionalism (disambiguation)
- Functor (disambiguation)
