= Arrow (computer science) =

In computer science, arrows or bolts are a type class used in computer programming to describe computations in a pure and declarative fashion. First proposed by computer scientist John Hughes as a generalization of monads, arrows provide a referentially transparent way to express relationships between logical steps in a computation. Unlike monads, arrows don't limit steps to having one and only one input. As a result, they have found use in functional reactive programming, tacit programming (point-free style), parsers, and in other uses.

== Motivation and history ==
While arrows were in use before being recognized as a distinct class, it wasn't until 2000 that John Hughes first published research focusing on them. Until then, monads had proven sufficient for most problems requiring the combination of program logic in pure code. However, some useful libraries, such as the Fudgets library for graphical user interfaces and certain efficient parsers, defied rewriting in a monadic form.

The formal concept of arrows was developed to explain these exceptions to monadic code, and in the process, monads were found to be a subset of arrows. Since then, arrows have been an active area of research. Their underlying laws and operations have been refined several times, with recent formulations such as arrow calculus requiring only five laws.

== Relation to category theory ==
In category theory, the Kleisli categories of all monads form a proper subset of Hughes arrows. While Freyd categories were believed to be equivalent to arrows for a time, it has since been proven that arrows are even more general: arrows are not merely equivalent, but directly equal to enriched Freyd categories.

== Definition ==
Like all type classes, arrows can be thought of as a set of qualities that can be applied to any data type. In the programming language Haskell, arrows allow functions (represented in Haskell by -> symbol) to combine in a reified form. However, the actual term "arrow" may also come from the fact that some (but not all) arrows correspond to the morphisms (also known as "arrows" in category theory) of different Kleisli categories. As a relatively new concept, there is no one, standard definition, but all formulations are logically equivalent, feature some required methods, and strictly obey certain mathematical laws.

=== Functions ===
The description currently used by the Haskell standard libraries requires only three basic operations:

- A type constructor arr that takes functions -> from any type s to another t, and lifts those functions into an arrow A between the two types.

arr : (s -> t) -> A s t

- A piping method first that takes an arrow between two types and converts it into an arrow between tuples. The first elements in the tuples represent the portion of the input and output that is altered, while the second elements are a third type u describing an unaltered portion that bypasses the computation.

first : A s t -> A (s,u) (t,u)

- As all arrows must be categories, they inherit a third operation from the class of categories: A composition operator >>> that can attach a second arrow to a first as long as the first function's output and the second's input have matching types.

(>>>) : A s t -> A t u -> A s u

Although only these three procedures are strictly needed to define an arrow, other methods can be derived to make arrows easier to work with in practice and theory.

One more helpful method can be derived from arr and first (and from which first can be derived):

- A merging operator *** that takes two arrows, possibly with different input and output types, and fuses them into one arrow between two compound types. The merge operator is not necessarily commutative.

(***) : A s t -> A u v -> A (s,u) (t,v)

=== Arrow laws ===
In addition to having some well-defined procedures, arrows must obey certain rules for any types they may be applied to:

- Arrows must always preserve all types' identities id (essentially the definitions of all values for all types within a category).

arr id              ==   id

- When connecting two functions f & g, the required arrow operations must distribute over compositions from the left.

arr (f >>> g)       ==   arr f  >>>  arr g
first (f >>> g)     ==   first f  >>>  first g

- In the previous laws, piping can be applied directly to functions because order must be irrelevant when piping & lifting occur together.

arr (first f)       ==   first (arr f)

The remaining laws restrict how the piping method behaves when the order of a composition is reversed, also allowing for simplifying expressions:

- If an identity is merged with a second function to form an arrow, attaching it to a piped function must be commutative.

arr (id *** g)  >>>  first f       ==   first f  >>>  arr (id *** g)

- Piping a function before type simplification must be equivalent to simplifying type before connecting to the unpiped function.

first f  >>>  arr ((s,t) -> s)     ==   arr ((s,t) -> s)  >>>  f

- Finally, piping a function twice before reassociating the resulting tuple, which is nested, should be the same as reassociating the nested tuple before attaching a single bypass of the function. In other words, stacked bypasses can be flattened by first bundling together those elements unchanged by the function.

first (first f)  >>>  arr ( ((s,t),u) -> (s,(t,u)) )   ==
  arr ( ((s,t),u) -> (s,(t,u)) )  >>>  first f

== Applications ==
Arrows may be extended to fit specific situations by defining added operations and restrictions. Commonly used versions include arrows with choice, which allow a computation to make conditional decisions, and arrows with feedback, which allow a step to take its own outputs as inputs. Another set of arrows, known as arrows with application, are rarely used in practice because they are equivalent to monads.

== Utility ==
Arrows have several benefits, mostly stemming from their ability to make program logic explicit yet concise. Besides avoiding side effects, purely functional programming creates more opportunities for static code analysis. This in turn can theoretically lead to better compiler optimizations, easier debugging, and features like syntax sugar.

Although no program strictly requires arrows, they generalize away much of the dense function passing that pure, declarative code would otherwise require. They can also encourage code reuse by giving common linkages between program steps their own class definitions. The ability to apply to types generically also contributes to reusability and keeps interfaces simple.

Arrows do have some disadvantages, including the initial effort of defining an arrow that satisfies the arrow laws. Because monads are usually easier to implement, and the extra features of arrows may be unnecessary, it is often preferable to use a monad. Another issue, which applies to many functional programming constructs, is efficiently compiling code with arrows into the imperative programming style used by computer instruction set architectures.

== Limits ==
The need to define an arr function to lift pure functions, limits the applicability of arrows. For example, bidirectional transformations cannot be arrows, because a program must provide a pure function, and its inverse, when using arr. This also limits the use of arrows to describe push-based reactive frameworks that stop unnecessary propagation. Similarly, the use of pairs to tuple values together results in a difficult coding style that requires additional combinators to re-group values, and raises fundamental questions about the equivalence of arrows grouped in different ways. These limits remain an open problem, and extensions such as Generalized Arrows and N-ary FRP explore these problems.

Much of the utility of arrows is subsumed by more general classes like profunctor (which requires only pre- and postcomposition with functions), which have application in optics. An arrow is essentially a strong profunctor that is also a category, although the laws differ slightly.
