= Functor (disambiguation) =

A functor, in mathematics, is a map between categories.

Functor may also refer to:

- Predicate functor in logic, a basic concept of predicate functor logic
- Function word in linguistics
- In computer programming:
  - Functor (functional programming)
  - Function object used to pass function pointers along with state information
  - for use of the term in Prolog language, see Prolog syntax and semantics
  - In OCaml and Standard ML, a functor is a higher-order module (a module parameterized by one or more other modules), often used to define type-safe abstracted algorithms and data structures.

== See also ==
- Function (disambiguation)
