= Premonoidal category =

In category theory, a premonoidal category is a generalisation of a monoidal category where the monoidal product need not be a bifunctor, but only to be functorial in its two arguments separately. This is in analogy with the concept of separate continuity in topology.

Premonoidal categories naturally arise in theoretical computer science as the Kleisli categories of strong monads. They also have a graphical language given by string diagrams with an extra wire going through each box so that they cannot be reordered.

== Funny tensor product ==
The category of small categories $\mathbf{Cat}$ is a closed monoidal category in exactly two ways: with the usual categorical product and with the funny tensor product. Given two categories $C$ and $D$, let $C \Rightarrow D$ be the category with functors $F, G : C \to D$ as objects and unnatural transformations $\alpha : F \Rightarrow G$ as arrows, i.e. families of morphisms $\{ \alpha_X : F(X) \to G(X) \}_{X \in C}$ which do not necessarily satisfy the condition for a natural transformation.

The funny tensor product is the left adjoint of unnatural transformations, i.e. there is a natural isomorphism $\mathbf{Cat}(C \ \Box \ D, D') \simeq \mathbf{Cat}(C, D \Rightarrow D' )$ for currying. It can be defined explicitly as the pushout of the span $(C \times D_0) \leftarrow (C_0 \times D_0) \to (C_0 \times D)$ where $C_0, D_0$ are the discrete categories of objects of $C, D$ and the two functors are inclusions. In the case of groups seen as one-object categories, this is called the free product.

== Sesquicategories ==
The same way we can define a monoidal category as a one-object 2-category, i.e. an enriched category over $(\mathbf{Cat}, \times)$ with the Cartesian product as monoidal structure, we can define a premonoidal category as a one-object sesquicategory, i.e. a category enriched over $(\mathbf{Cat}, \Box)$ with the funny tensor product as monoidal structure. This is called a sesquicategory (literally, "one-and-a-half category") because it is like a 2-category without the interchange law $(\alpha\circ_0\beta)\circ_1(\gamma\circ_0\delta) = (\alpha\circ_1\gamma)\circ_0(\beta\circ_1\delta)$.
