= Applicative =

Applicative can refer to:

- Applicative programming language
- Applicative voice
- Applicative functor
