= Modular lambda function =

Symmetric holomorphic function

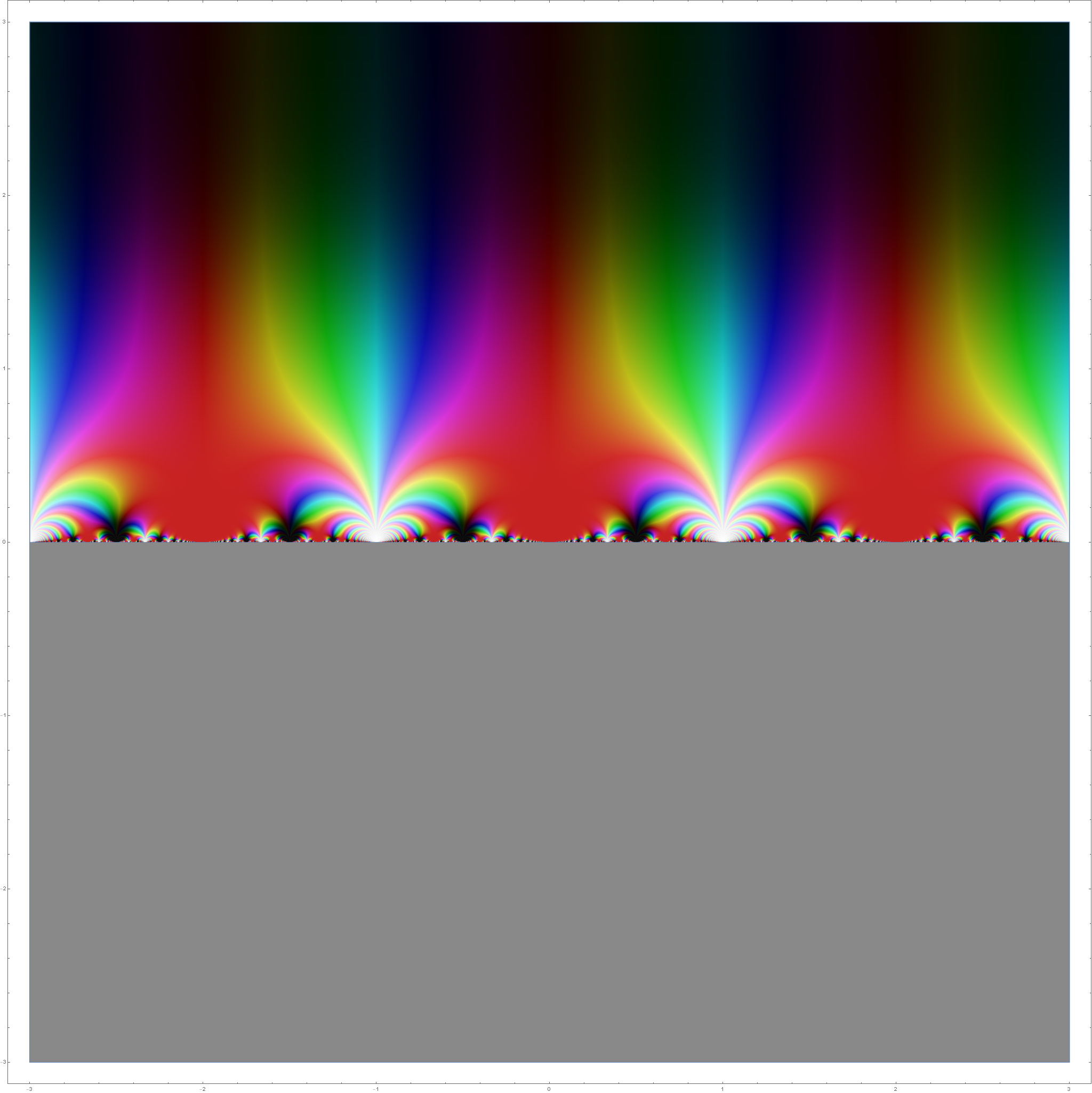
Modular lambda function in the complex plane.

In mathematics, the modular lambda function λ(τ) (Note: $\lambda(\tau)$ is not a modular function (per the Wikipedia definition), but every modular function is a rational function in $\lambda(\tau)$. Some authors use a non-equivalent definition of "modular functions".) is a highly symmetric holomorphic function on the complex upper half-plane. It is invariant under the fractional linear action of the congruence subgroup $\Gamma(2)$ of $\operatorname{SL}_2(\Z)$, and generates the function field of the corresponding quotient, i.e., it is a Hauptmodul for the modular curve $X(2)$. Over any point $\tau$, its value can be described as a cross ratio of the branch points of a ramified double cover of the projective line by the elliptic curve $\C/\langle 1, \tau \rangle$, where the map is defined as the quotient by the [−1] involution.

The q-expansion, where $q = e^{\pi i \tau}$ is the nome, is given by

$$\lambda(\tau) = 16q - 128q^2 + 704 q^3 - 3072q^4 + 11488q^5 - 38400q^6 + \dots$$

(sequence A115977 in the OEIS). By symmetrizing the lambda function under the canonical action of the symmetric group $X(2)$ on $S_3$, and then normalizing suitably, one obtains a function on the upper half-plane that is invariant under the full modular group $\operatorname{SL}_2(\Z)$, and it is in fact Klein's modular j-invariant.

A plot of x→ λ(ix)

== Modular properties ==
The function $\lambda(\tau)$ is invariant under the group generated by

$$\tau \mapsto \tau+2, \quad \tau \mapsto \frac{\tau}{1-2\tau}.$$

The generators of the modular group act by

$$\tau \mapsto \tau+1 \ :\  \lambda \mapsto \frac{\lambda}{\lambda-1} \, ;$$
$$\tau \mapsto -\frac{1}{\tau} \ :\  \lambda \mapsto 1 - \lambda.$$

Consequently, the action of the modular group on $\lambda(\tau)$ is that of the anharmonic group, giving the six values of the cross-ratio:

$$\left\lbrace { \lambda, \frac{1}{1-\lambda}, \frac{\lambda-1}{\lambda}, \frac{1}{\lambda}, \frac{\lambda}{\lambda-1}, 1-\lambda } \right\rbrace \ .$$

== Relations to other functions ==
It is the square of the elliptic modulus, that is, $\lambda(\tau)=k^2(\tau)$. In terms of the Dedekind eta function $\eta(\tau)$ and theta functions,

$$\lambda(\tau) = \Bigg(\frac{\sqrt{2}\,\eta(\tfrac{\tau}{2})\eta^2(2\tau)}{\eta^3(\tau)}\Bigg)^8 = \frac{16}{\left(\frac{\eta(\tau/2)}{\eta(2\tau)}\right)^8 + 16} =\frac{\theta_2^4(\tau)}{\theta_3^4(\tau)}$$

and,

$$\frac{1}{\big(\lambda(\tau)\big)^{1/4}}-\big(\lambda(\tau)\big)^{1/4} = \frac{1}{2}\left(\frac{\eta(\tfrac{\tau}{4})}{\eta(\tau)}\right)^4 = 2\,\frac{\theta_4^2(\tfrac{\tau}{2})}{\theta_2^2(\tfrac{\tau}{2})}$$

where

$$\theta_2(\tau) =\sum_{n=-\infty}^\infty e^{\pi i\tau (n+1/2)^2}$$

$$\theta_3(\tau) = \sum_{n=-\infty}^\infty e^{\pi i\tau n^2}$$

$$\theta_4(\tau) = \sum_{n=-\infty}^\infty (-1)^n e^{\pi i\tau n^2}$$

In terms of the half-periods of Weierstrass's elliptic functions, let $[\omega_1,\omega_2]$ be a fundamental pair of periods with $\tau=\frac{\omega_2}{\omega_1}$.

$$e_1 = \wp\left(\frac{\omega_1}{2}\right), \quad e_2 = \wp\left(\frac{\omega_2}{2}\right),\quad e_3 = \wp\left(\frac{\omega_1+\omega_2}{2}\right)$$

we have

$$\lambda = \frac{e_3-e_2}{e_1-e_2}.$$

Since the three half-period values are distinct, this shows that $\lambda$ does not take the value 0 or 1.

The relation to the j-invariant is

$$j(\tau) = \frac{256(1-\lambda(1-\lambda))^3}{(\lambda(1-\lambda))^2} = \frac{256(1-\lambda+\lambda^2)^3}{\lambda^2 (1-\lambda)^2}.$$

which is the j-invariant of the elliptic curve of Legendre form $y^2=x(x-1)(x-\lambda)$

Given $m\in\C\setminus\{0,1\}$, let

$$\tau=i\frac{K\{1-m\}}{K\{m\}}$$

where $K$ is the complete elliptic integral of the first kind with parameter $m=k^2$. Then

$$\lambda (\tau)=m.$$

== Modular equations ==
The modular equation of degree $p$ (where $p$ is a prime number) is an algebraic equation in $\lambda (p\tau)$ and $\lambda (\tau)$. If $\lambda (p\tau)=u^8$ and $\lambda (\tau)=v^8$, the modular equations of degrees $p=2,3,5,7$ are, respectively,

$$(1+u^4)^2v^8-4u^4=0,$$
$$u^4-v^4+2uv(1-u^2v^2)=0,$$
$$u^6-v^6+5u^2v^2(u^2-v^2)+4uv(1-u^4v^4)=0,$$
$$(1-u^8)(1-v^8)-(1-uv)^8=0.$$

The quantity $v$ (and hence $u$) can be thought of as a holomorphic function on the upper half-plane $\operatorname{Im}\tau>0$:

$$\begin{align}v&=\prod_{k=1}^\infty \tanh\frac{(k-1/2)\pi i}{\tau}=\sqrt{2}e^{\pi i\tau/8}\frac{\sum_{k\in\mathbb{Z}}e^{(2k^2+k)\pi i\tau}}{\sum_{k\in\mathbb{Z}}e^{k^2\pi i\tau}}\\
&=\cfrac{\sqrt{2}e^{\pi i\tau/8}}{1+\cfrac{e^{\pi i\tau}}{1+e^{\pi i\tau}+\cfrac{e^{2\pi i\tau}}{1+e^{2\pi i\tau}+\cfrac{e^{3\pi i\tau}}{1+e^{3\pi i\tau}+\ddots}}}}\end{align}$$

Since $\lambda(i)=1/2$, the modular equations can be used to give algebraic values of $\lambda(pi)$ for any prime $p$. (Note: For any prime power, we can iterate the modular equation of degree $p$. This process can be used to give algebraic values of $\lambda (ni)$ for any $n\in\mathbb{N}.$) The algebraic values of $\lambda(ni)$ are also given by (Note: $\operatorname{sl}a\varpi$ is algebraic for every $a\in\mathbb{Q}.$)

$$\lambda (ni)=\prod_{k=1}^{n/2} \operatorname{sl}^8\frac{(2k-1)\varpi}{2n}\quad (n\,\text{even})$$
$$\lambda (ni)=\frac{1}{2^n}\prod_{k=1}^{n-1} \left(1-\operatorname{sl}^2\frac{k\varpi}{n}\right)^2\quad (n\,\text{odd})$$

where $\operatorname{sl}$ is the lemniscate sine and $\varpi$ is the lemniscate constant.

== Lambda-star ==
=== Definition and computation of lambda-star ===
The function $\lambda^*(x)$ (where $x\in\mathbb{R}^+$) gives the value of the elliptic modulus $k$, for which the complete elliptic integral of the first kind $K(k)$ and its complementary counterpart $K(\sqrt{1-k^2})$ are related by following expression:

$$\frac{K\left[\sqrt{1-\lambda^*(x)^2}\right]}{K[\lambda^*(x)]} = \sqrt{x}$$

The values of $\lambda^*(x)$ can be computed as follows:

$$\lambda^*(x) = \frac{\theta^2_2(i\sqrt{x})}{\theta^2_3(i\sqrt{x})}$$

$$\lambda^*(x) = \left[\sum_{a=-\infty}^\infty\exp[-(a+1/2)^2\pi\sqrt{x}]\right]^2\left[\sum_{a=-\infty}^\infty\exp(-a^2\pi\sqrt{x})\right]^{-2}$$

$$\lambda^*(x) = \left[\sum_{a=-\infty}^\infty\operatorname{sech}[(a+1/2)\pi\sqrt{x}]\right]\left[\sum_{a=-\infty}^\infty\operatorname{sech}(a\pi\sqrt{x})\right]^{-1}$$

The functions $\lambda^*$ and $\lambda$ are related to each other in this way:

$$\lambda^*(x) = \sqrt{\lambda(i\sqrt{x})}$$

=== Properties of lambda-star ===
Every $\lambda^*$ value of a positive rational number is a positive algebraic number:

$$\lambda^*(x) \in \overline{\mathbb{Q}}_+ \quad \forall x\in\mathbb{Q}^+.$$

$K(\lambda^*(x))$ and $E(\lambda^*(x))$ (the complete elliptic integral of the second kind) can be expressed in closed form in terms of the gamma function for any $x\in\mathbb{Q}^+$, as Selberg and Chowla proved in 1949.

The following expression is valid for all $n \in \mathbb{N}$:

$$\sqrt{n} =  \sum_{a = 1}^{n} \operatorname{dn}\left[\frac{2a}{n}K\left[\lambda^*\left(\frac{1}{n}\right)\right];\lambda^*\left(\frac{1}{n}\right)\right]$$

where $\operatorname{dn}$ is the Jacobi elliptic function delta amplitudinis with modulus $k$.

By knowing one $\lambda^*$ value, this formula can be used to compute related $\lambda^*$ values:

$$\lambda^*(n^2x) = \lambda^*(x)^n\prod_{a=1}^{n}\operatorname{sn}\left\{\frac{2a-1}{n}K[\lambda^*(x)];\lambda^*(x)\right\}^2$$

where $n\in\mathbb{N}$ and $\operatorname{sn}$ is the Jacobi elliptic function sinus amplitudinis with modulus $k$.

Further relations:

$$\lambda^*(x)^2 + \lambda^*(1/x)^2 = 1$$

$$[\lambda^*(x)+1][\lambda^*(4/x)+1] = 2$$

$$\lambda^*(4x) = \frac{1-\sqrt{1-\lambda^*(x)^2}}{1+\sqrt{1-\lambda^*(x)^2}} = \tan\left\{\frac{1}{2}\arcsin[\lambda^*(x)]\right\}^2$$

$$\lambda^*(x) - \lambda^*(9x) = 2[\lambda^*(x)\lambda^*(9x)]^{1/4} - 2[\lambda^*(x)\lambda^*(9x)]^{3/4}$$

$$\begin{align}
& a^{6}-f^{6} = 2af +2a^5f^5\, &\left(a = \left[\frac{2\lambda^*(x)}{1-\lambda^*(x)^2}\right]^{1/12}\right) &\left(f = \left[\frac{2\lambda^*(25x)}{1-\lambda^*(25x)^2}\right]^{1/12}\right) \\
&a^{8}+b^{8}-7a^4b^4 = 2\sqrt{2}ab+2\sqrt{2}a^7b^7\, &\left(a = \left[\frac{2\lambda^*(x)}{1-\lambda^*(x)^2}\right]^{1/12}\right) &\left(b = \left[\frac{2\lambda^*(49x)}{1-\lambda^*(49x)^2}\right]^{1/12}\right) \\
& a^{12}-c^{12} = 2\sqrt{2}(ac+a^3c^3)(1+3a^2c^2+a^4c^4)(2+3a^2c^2+2a^4c^4)\, &\left(a = \left[\frac{2\lambda^*(x)}{1-\lambda^*(x)^2}\right]^{1/12}\right) &\left(c = \left[\frac{2\lambda^*(121x)}{1-\lambda^*(121x)^2}\right]^{1/12}\right) \\
& (a^2-d^2)(a^4+d^4-7a^2d^2)[(a^2-d^2)^4-a^2d^2(a^2+d^2)^2] = 8ad+8a^{13}d^{13}\, &\left(a = \left[\frac{2\lambda^*(x)}{1-\lambda^*(x)^2}\right]^{1/12}\right) &\left(d = \left[\frac{2\lambda^*(169x)}{1-\lambda^*(169x)^2}\right]^{1/12}\right)
\end{align}$$

Special values

Lambda-star values of integer numbers of 4n-3-type:

$$\lambda^*(1) = \frac{1}{\sqrt{2}}$$

$$\lambda^*(5) = \sin\left[\frac{1}{2}\arcsin\left(\sqrt{5}-2\right)\right]$$

$$\lambda^*(9) = \frac{1}{2}(\sqrt{3}-1)(\sqrt{2}-\sqrt[4]{3})$$

$$\lambda^*(13) = \sin\left[\frac{1}{2}\arcsin(5\sqrt{13}-18)\right]$$

$$\lambda^*(17) = \sin\left\{\frac{1}{2}\arcsin\left[\frac{1}{64}\left(5+\sqrt{17}-\sqrt{10\sqrt{17}+26}\right)^3\right]\right\}$$

$$\lambda^*(21) = \sin\left\{\frac{1}{2}\arcsin[(8-3\sqrt{7})(2\sqrt{7}-3\sqrt{3})]\right\}$$

$$\lambda^*(25) = \frac{1}{\sqrt{2}}(\sqrt{5}-2)(3-2\sqrt[4]{5})$$

$$\lambda^*(33) = \sin\left\{\frac{1}{2}\arcsin[(10-3\sqrt{11})(2-\sqrt{3})^3]\right\}$$

$$\lambda^*(37) = \sin\left\{\frac{1}{2}\arcsin[(\sqrt{37}-6)^3]\right\}$$

$$\lambda^*(45) = \sin\left\{\frac{1}{2}\arcsin[(4-\sqrt{15})^2(\sqrt{5}-2)^3]\right\}$$

$$\lambda^*(49) = \frac{1}{4}(8+3\sqrt{7})(5-\sqrt{7}-\sqrt[4]{28})\left(\sqrt{14}-\sqrt{2}-\sqrt[8]{28}\sqrt{5-\sqrt{7}}\right)$$

$$\lambda^*(57) = \sin\left\{\frac{1}{2}\arcsin[(170-39\sqrt{19})(2-\sqrt{3})^3]\right\}$$

$$\lambda^*(73) = \sin\left\{\frac{1}{2}\arcsin\left[\frac{1}{64}\left(45+5\sqrt{73}-3\sqrt{50\sqrt{73}+426}\right)^3\right]\right\}$$

Lambda-star values of integer numbers of 4n-2-type:

$$\lambda^*(2) = \sqrt{2}-1$$

$$\lambda^*(6) = (2-\sqrt{3})(\sqrt{3}-\sqrt{2})$$

$$\lambda^*(10) = (\sqrt{10}-3)(\sqrt{2}-1)^2$$

$$\lambda^*(14) = \tan\left\{\frac{1}{2}\arctan\left[\frac{1}{8}\left(2\sqrt{2}+1-\sqrt{4\sqrt{2}+5}\right)^3\right]\right\}$$

$$\lambda^*(18) = (\sqrt{2}-1)^3(2-\sqrt{3})^2$$

$$\lambda^*(22) = (10-3\sqrt{11})(3\sqrt{11}-7\sqrt{2})$$

$$\lambda^*(30) = \tan\left\{\frac{1}{2}\arctan[(\sqrt{10}-3)^2(\sqrt{5}-2)^2]\right\}$$

$$\lambda^*(34) = \tan\left\{\frac{1}{4}\arcsin\left[\frac{1}{9}(\sqrt{17}-4)^2\right]\right\}$$

$$\lambda^*(42) = \tan\left\{\frac{1}{2}\arctan[(2\sqrt{7}-3\sqrt{3})^2(2\sqrt{2}-\sqrt{7})^2]\right\}$$

$$\lambda^*(46) = \tan\left\{\frac{1}{2}\arctan\left[\frac{1}{64}\left(3+\sqrt{2}-\sqrt{6\sqrt{2}+7}\right)^6\right]\right\}$$

$$\lambda^*(58) = (13\sqrt{58}-99)(\sqrt{2}-1)^6$$

$$\lambda^*(70) = \tan\left\{\frac{1}{2}\arctan[(\sqrt{5}-2)^4(\sqrt{2}-1)^6]\right\}$$

$$\lambda^*(78) = \tan\left\{\frac{1}{2}\arctan[(5\sqrt{13}-18)^2(\sqrt{26}-5)^2]\right\}$$

$$\lambda^*(82) = \tan\left\{\frac{1}{4}\arcsin\left[\frac{1}{4761}(8\sqrt{41}-51)^2\right]\right\}$$

Lambda-star values of integer numbers of 4n-1-type:

$$\lambda^*(3) = \frac{1}{2\sqrt{2}}(\sqrt{3}-1)$$

$$\lambda^*(7) = \frac{1}{4\sqrt{2}}(3-\sqrt{7})$$

$$\lambda^*(11) = \frac{1}{8\sqrt{2}}(\sqrt{11}+3)\left(\frac{1}{3}\sqrt[3]{6\sqrt{3}+2\sqrt{11}}-\frac{1}{3}\sqrt[3]{6\sqrt{3}-2\sqrt{11}}+\frac{1}{3}\sqrt{11}-1\right)^4$$

$$\lambda^*(15) = \frac{1}{8\sqrt{2}}(3-\sqrt{5})(\sqrt{5}-\sqrt{3})(2-\sqrt{3})$$

$$\lambda^*(19) = \frac{1}{8\sqrt{2}}(3\sqrt{19}+13)\left[\frac{1}{6}(\sqrt{19}-2+\sqrt{3})\sqrt[3]{3\sqrt{3}-\sqrt{19}}-\frac{1}{6}(\sqrt{19}-2-\sqrt{3})\sqrt[3]{3\sqrt{3}+\sqrt{19}}-\frac{1}{3}(5-\sqrt{19})\right]^4$$

$$\lambda^*(23) = \frac{1}{16\sqrt{2}}(5+\sqrt{23})\left[\frac{1}{6}(\sqrt{3}+1)\sqrt[3]{100-12\sqrt{69}}-\frac{1}{6}(\sqrt{3}-1)\sqrt[3]{100+12\sqrt{69}}+\frac{2}{3}\right]^4$$

$$\lambda^*(27) = \frac{1}{16\sqrt{2}}(\sqrt{3}-1)^3\left[\frac{1}{3}\sqrt{3}(\sqrt[3]{4}-\sqrt[3]{2}+1)-\sqrt[3]{2}+1\right]^4$$

$$\lambda^*(39) = \sin\left\{\frac{1}{2}\arcsin\left[\frac{1}{16}\left(6-\sqrt{13}-3\sqrt{6\sqrt{13}-21}\right)\right]\right\}$$

$$\lambda^*(55) = \sin\left\{\frac{1}{2}\arcsin\left[\frac{1}{512}\left(3\sqrt{5}-3-\sqrt{6\sqrt{5}-2}\right)^3\right]\right\}$$

Lambda-star values of integer numbers of 4n-type:

$$\lambda^*(4) = (\sqrt{2}-1)^2$$

$$\lambda^*(8) = \left(\sqrt{2}+1-\sqrt{2\sqrt{2}+2}\right)^2$$

$$\lambda^*(12) = (\sqrt{3}-\sqrt{2})^2(\sqrt{2}-1)^2$$

$$\lambda^*(16) = (\sqrt{2}+1)^2(\sqrt[4]{2}-1)^4$$

$$\lambda^*(20) = \tan\left[\frac{1}{4}\arcsin(\sqrt{5}-2)\right]^2$$

$$\lambda^*(24) = \tan\left\{\frac{1}{2}\arcsin[(2-\sqrt{3})(\sqrt{3}-\sqrt{2})]\right\}^2$$

$$\lambda^*(28) = (2\sqrt{2}-\sqrt{7})^2(\sqrt{2}-1)^4$$

$$\lambda^*(32) = \tan\left\{\frac{1}{2}\arcsin\left[\left(\sqrt{2}+1-\sqrt{2\sqrt{2}+2}\right)^2\right]\right\}^2$$

Lambda-star values of rational fractions:

$$\lambda^*\left(\frac{1}{2}\right) = \sqrt{2\sqrt{2}-2}$$

$$\lambda^*\left(\frac{1}{3}\right) = \frac{1}{2\sqrt{2}}(\sqrt{3}+1)$$

$$\lambda^*\left(\frac{2}{3}\right) = (2-\sqrt{3})(\sqrt{3}+\sqrt{2})$$

$$\lambda^*\left(\frac{1}{4}\right) = 2\sqrt[4]{2}(\sqrt{2}-1)$$

$$\lambda^*\left(\frac{3}{4}\right) = \sqrt[4]{8}(\sqrt{3}-\sqrt{2})(\sqrt{2}+1)\sqrt{(\sqrt{3}-1)^3}$$

$$\lambda^*\left(\frac{1}{5}\right) = \frac{1}{2\sqrt{2}}\left(\sqrt{2\sqrt{5}-2}+\sqrt{5}-1\right)$$

$$\lambda^*\left(\frac{2}{5}\right) = (\sqrt{10}-3)(\sqrt{2}+1)^2$$

$$\lambda^*\left(\frac{3}{5}\right) = \frac{1}{8\sqrt{2}}(3+\sqrt{5})(\sqrt{5}-\sqrt{3})(2+\sqrt{3})$$

$$\lambda^*\left(\frac{4}{5}\right) = \tan\left[\frac{\pi}{4}-\frac{1}{4}\arcsin(\sqrt{5}-2)\right]^2$$

=== Ramanujan's class invariants ===
Ramanujan's class invariants $G_n$ and $g_n$ are defined as

$$G_n=2^{-1/4}e^{\pi\sqrt{n}/24}\prod_{k=0}^\infty \left(1+e^{-(2k+1)\pi\sqrt{n}}\right),$$
$$g_n=2^{-1/4}e^{\pi\sqrt{n}/24}\prod_{k=0}^\infty \left(1-e^{-(2k+1)\pi\sqrt{n}}\right),$$

where $n\in\mathbb{Q}^+$. For such $n$, the class invariants are algebraic numbers. For example

$$g_{58}=\sqrt{\frac{5+\sqrt{29}}{2}}, \quad g_{190}=\sqrt{(\sqrt{5}+2)(\sqrt{10}+3)}.$$

Identities with the class invariants include

$$G_n=G_{1/n},\quad g_{n}=\frac{1}{g_{4/n}},\quad g_{4n}=2^{1/4}g_nG_n.$$

The class invariants are very closely related to the Weber modular functions $\mathfrak{f}$ and $\mathfrak{f}_1$. These are the relations between lambda-star and the class invariants:

$$G_n = \sin\{2\arcsin[\lambda^*(n)]\}^{-1/12} = 1\Big /\left[\sqrt[12]{2\lambda^*(n)}\sqrt[24]{1-\lambda^*(n)^2}\right]$$

$$g_n = \tan\{2\arctan[\lambda^*(n)]\}^{-1/12} = \sqrt[12]{[1-\lambda^*(n)^2]/[2\lambda^*(n)]}$$

$$\lambda^*(n) = \tan\left\{ \frac{1}{2}\arctan[g_n^{-12}]\right\} = \sqrt{g_n^{24}+1}-g_n^{12}$$

== Other appearances ==
=== Little Picard theorem ===
The lambda function is used in the original proof of the Little Picard theorem, that an entire non-constant function on the complex plane cannot omit more than one value. This theorem was proved by Picard in 1879. Suppose if possible that $f$ is entire and does not take the values 0 and 1. Since $\lambda$ is holomorphic, it has a local holomorphic inverse $\omega$ defined away from $0,1,\infty$. Consider the function $z\mapsto \omega(f(z))$. By the Monodromy theorem this is holomorphic and maps the complex plane $\C$ to the upper half plane. From this it is easy to construct a holomorphic function from $\C$ to the unit disc, which by Liouville's theorem must be constant.

=== Moonshine ===
The function $\tau\mapsto 16/\lambda(2\tau) - 8$ is the normalized Hauptmodul for the group $\Gamma_0(4)$, and its q-expansion

$$q^{-1} + 20q - 62q^3 + \dots$$

(sequence A007248 in the OEIS), where $q=e^{2\pi i\tau }$, is the graded character of any element in conjugacy class 4C of the monster group acting on the monster vertex algebra.
