= Functional group (disambiguation) =

The term functional group may have several meanings:

- Functional group, in organic chemistry, a group of atoms responsible for the characteristic chemical reactions of a molecule
- Functional group (ecology), a collection of organisms
- The Party of the Functional Groups, also known as Golkar, a political party in Indonesia

== See also ==
- Function (disambiguation)
- Functional (disambiguation)
- Group (disambiguation)
