= Functional =

Functional may refer to:

- Movements in architecture:
  - Functionalism (architecture)
  - Form follows function
- Functional group, combination of atoms within molecules
- Medical conditions without currently visible organic basis:
  - Functional symptom
  - Functional disorder
- Functional classification for roads
- Functional organization
- Functional training

== In mathematics ==
- Functional (mathematics), a term applied to certain scalar-valued functions in mathematics and computer science
  - Minnesota functionals
  - Functional analysis, a branch of mathematical analysis
  - Linear functional, a type of functional often simply called a functional in the context of functional analysis
- Higher-order function, also called a functional, a function that takes other functions as arguments

== In computer science, software engineering ==
- "Functional" (noun) may be used as a synonym for Higher-order function
- functional (C++), a header file in the C++ Standard Library
- Functional design, a paradigm used to simplify the design of hardware and software devices
- Functional model, a structured representation of functions, activities or processes in systems and software engineering
- Functional programming, a programming paradigm based on mathematical functions rather than changes in variable states
- In an ontology (information science), "functional" is a property or relation that can only hold a single value for a given individual

== See also ==
- Function (disambiguation)
- Functionalism (disambiguation)
- Functional group (disambiguation)
- Functional grammar (disambiguation)
