= Monad transformer =

In functional programming, a monad transformer is a type constructor which takes a monad as an argument and returns a monad as a result.

Monad transformers can be used to compose features encapsulated by monads – such as state, exception handling, and I/O – in a modular way. Typically, a monad transformer is created by generalising an existing monad; applying the resulting monad transformer to the identity monad yields a monad which is equivalent to the original monad (ignoring any necessary boxing and unboxing).

== Definition ==
A monad transformer consists of:

1. A type constructor t of kind (* -> *) -> * -> *
2. Monad operations return and bind (or an equivalent formulation) for all t m where m is a monad, satisfying the monad laws
3. An additional operation, lift :: m a -> t m a, satisfying the following laws: (the notation `bind` below indicates infix application):
  1. lift . return = return
  2. lift (m `bind` k) = (lift m) `bind` (lift . k)

== Examples ==
=== The option monad transformer ===
Given any monad $\mathrm{M} \, A$, the option monad transformer $\mathrm{M} \left( A^{?} \right)$ (where $A^{?}$ denotes the option type) is defined by:

$$\begin{array}{ll}
\mathrm{return}: & A \rarr \mathrm{M} \left( A^{?} \right)\\
& a \mapsto \mathrm{return} (\mathrm{Just}\,a) \\
\mathrm{bind}: & \mathrm{M} \left( A^{?} \right) \rarr \left( A \rarr \mathrm{M} \left( B^{?} \right) \right) \rarr \mathrm{M} \left( B^{?} \right)\\
& m \mapsto f \mapsto \mathrm{bind} \, m \, \left(a \mapsto \begin{cases} \mbox{return Nothing} & \mbox{if } a = \mathrm{Nothing}\\ f \, a' & \mbox{if } a = \mathrm{Just} \, a' \end{cases} \right) \\
\mathrm{lift}: & \mathrm{M} (A) \rarr \mathrm{M} \left( A^{?} \right)\\
& m \mapsto \mathrm{bind} \, m \, (a \mapsto \mathrm{return} (\mathrm{Just} \, a)) \end{array}$$

=== The exception monad transformer ===
Given any monad $\mathrm{M} \, A$, the exception monad transformer $\mathrm{M} (A + E)$ (where E is the type of exceptions) is defined by:

$$\begin{array}{ll}
\mathrm{return}: & A \rarr \mathrm{M} (A + E)\\
& a \mapsto \mathrm{return} (\mathrm{value}\,a) \\
\mathrm{bind}: & \mathrm{M} (A + E) \rarr (A \rarr \mathrm{M} (B + E)) \rarr \mathrm{M} (B + E)\\
& m \mapsto f \mapsto \mathrm{bind} \, m \,\left( a \mapsto \begin{cases} \mbox{return err } e & \mbox{if } a = \mathrm{err} \, e\\ f \, a' & \mbox{if } a = \mathrm{value} \, a' \end{cases} \right) \\
\mathrm{lift}: & \mathrm{M} \, A \rarr \mathrm{M} (A + E)\\
& m \mapsto \mathrm{bind} \, m \, (a \mapsto \mathrm{return} (\mathrm{value} \, a)) \\
\end{array}$$

=== The reader monad transformer ===
Given any monad $\mathrm{M} \, A$, the reader monad transformer $E \rarr \mathrm{M}\,A$ (where E is the environment type) is defined by:

$$\begin{array}{ll}
\mathrm{return}: & A \rarr E \rarr \mathrm{M} \, A\\
& a \mapsto e \mapsto \mathrm{return} \, a \\
\mathrm{bind}: & (E \rarr \mathrm{M} \, A) \rarr (A \rarr E \rarr \mathrm{M}\,B) \rarr E \rarr \mathrm{M}\,B\\
& m \mapsto k \mapsto e \mapsto \mathrm{bind} \, (m \, e) \,( a \mapsto k \, a \, e) \\
\mathrm{lift}: & \mathrm{M} \, A \rarr E \rarr \mathrm{M} \, A\\
& a \mapsto e \mapsto a \\
\end{array}$$

=== The state monad transformer ===
Given any monad $\mathrm{M} \, A$, the state monad transformer $S \rarr \mathrm{M}(A \times S)$ (where S is the state type) is defined by:

$$\begin{array}{ll}
\mathrm{return}: & A \rarr S \rarr \mathrm{M} (A \times S)\\
& a \mapsto s \mapsto \mathrm{return} \, (a, s) \\
\mathrm{bind}: & (S \rarr \mathrm{M}(A \times S)) \rarr (A \rarr S \rarr \mathrm{M}(B \times S)) \rarr S \rarr \mathrm{M}(B \times S)\\
& m \mapsto k \mapsto s \mapsto \mathrm{bind} \, (m \, s) \,((a, s') \mapsto k \, a \, s') \\
\mathrm{lift}: & \mathrm{M} \, A \rarr S \rarr \mathrm{M}(A \times S)\\
& m \mapsto s \mapsto \mathrm{bind} \, m \, (a \mapsto \mathrm{return} \, (a, s)) \end{array}$$

=== The writer monad transformer ===
Given any monad $\mathrm{M} \, A$, the writer monad transformer $\mathrm{M}(W \times A)$ (where W is endowed with a monoid operation ∗ with identity element $\varepsilon$) is defined by:

$$\begin{array}{ll}
\mathrm{return}: & A \rarr \mathrm{M} (W \times A)\\
& a \mapsto \mathrm{return} \, (\varepsilon, a) \\
\mathrm{bind}: & \mathrm{M}(W \times A) \rarr (A \rarr \mathrm{M}(W \times B)) \rarr \mathrm{M}(W \times B)\\
& m \mapsto f \mapsto \mathrm{bind} \, m \,((w, a) \mapsto \mathrm{bind} \, (f \, a) \, ((w', b) \mapsto \mathrm{return} \, (w * w', b))) \\
\mathrm{lift}: & \mathrm{M} \, A \rarr \mathrm{M}(W \times A)\\
& m \mapsto \mathrm{bind} \, m \, (a \mapsto \mathrm{return} \, (\varepsilon, a)) \\
\end{array}$$

=== The continuation monad transformer ===
Given any monad $\mathrm{M} \, A$, the continuation monad transformer maps an arbitrary type R into functions of type $(A \rarr \mathrm{M} \, R) \rarr \mathrm{M} \, R$, where R is the result type of the continuation. It is defined by:

$$\begin{array}{ll}
\mathrm{return} \colon & A \rarr \left( A \rarr \mathrm{M} \, R \right) \rarr \mathrm{M} \, R\\
& a \mapsto k \mapsto k \, a \\
\mathrm{bind} \colon & \left( \left( A \rarr \mathrm{M} \, R \right) \rarr \mathrm{M} \, R \right) \rarr \left( A \rarr \left( B \rarr \mathrm{M} \, R \right) \rarr \mathrm{M} \, R \right) \rarr \left( B \rarr \mathrm{M} \, R \right) \rarr \mathrm{M} \, R\\
& c \mapsto f \mapsto k \mapsto c \, \left( a \mapsto f \, a \, k \right) \\
\mathrm{lift} \colon & \mathrm{M} \, A \rarr (A \rarr \mathrm{M} \, R) \rarr \mathrm{M} \, R\\
& \mathrm{bind}
\end{array}$$

Note that monad transformations are usually not commutative: for instance, applying the state transformer to the option monad yields a type $S \rarr \left(A \times S \right)^{?}$ (a computation which may fail and yield no final state), whereas the converse transformation has type $S \rarr \left(A^{?} \times S \right)$ (a computation which yields a final state and an optional return value).

== See also ==
- Monads in functional programming
