= Strong monad =

In category theory, a strong monad is a monad on a monoidal category with an additional natural transformation, called the strength, which governs how the monad interacts with the monoidal product.

Strong monads play an important role in theoretical computer science where they are used to model computation with side effects.

== Definition ==
A (left) strong monad is a monad (T, η, μ) over a monoidal category (C, ⊗, I) together with a natural transformation t_{A,B} : A ⊗ TB → T(A ⊗ B), called (tensorial) left strength, such that the diagrams

, ,
, and

commute for every object A, B and C.

== Commutative strong monads ==
For every strong monad T on a symmetric monoidal category, a right strength natural transformation can be defined by

$$t'_{A,B}=T(\gamma_{B,A})\circ t_{B,A}\circ\gamma_{TA,B} : TA\otimes B\to T(A\otimes B).$$

A strong monad T is said to be commutative when the diagram

commutes for all objects $A$ and $B$.

== Properties ==
The Kleisli category of a commutative monad is symmetric monoidal in a canonical way; see corollary 7 in Guitart and corollary 4.3 in Power & Robison. When a monad is strong but not necessarily commutative, its Kleisli category is a premonoidal category.

One interesting fact about commutative strong monads is that they are "the same as" symmetric monoidal monads. More explicitly,

- a commutative strong monad $(T,\eta,\mu,t)$ defines a symmetric monoidal monad $(T,\eta,\mu,m)$ by
  $$m_{A,B}=\mu_{A\otimes B}\circ Tt'_{A,B}\circ t_{TA,B}:TA\otimes TB\to T(A\otimes B)$$
- and conversely a symmetric monoidal monad $(T,\eta,\mu,m)$ defines a commutative strong monad $(T,\eta,\mu,t)$ by
  $$t_{A,B}=m_{A,B}\circ(\eta_A\otimes 1_{TB}):A\otimes TB\to T(A\otimes B)$$

and the conversion between one and the other presentation is bijective.
