= Functor (functional programming) =

Design pattern in pure functional programming

Applying fmap (+1) to a binary tree of integers increments each integer in the tree by one.

In functional programming, a functor is a design pattern inspired by the definition from category theory that allows one to apply a function to values inside a generic type without changing the structure of the generic type. In Haskell this idea can be captured in a type class:

class Functor f where
  fmap :: (a -> b) -> f a -> f b

This declaration says that any instance of Functor must support a method fmap, which maps a function over the elements of the instance.

Functors in Haskell should also obey the so-called functor laws, which state that the mapping operation preserves the identity function and composition of functions:

fmap id = id
fmap (g . h) = (fmap g) . (fmap h)

where . stands for function composition.

In Scala a trait can instead be used:

trait Functor[F[_]] {
  def map[A,B](a: F[A])(f: A => B): F[B]
}

Functors form a base for more complex abstractions like applicative functors, monads, and comonads, all of which build atop a canonical functor structure. Functors are useful in modeling functional effects by values of parameterized data types. Modifiable computations are modeled by allowing a pure function to be applied to values of the "inner" type, thus creating the new overall value which represents the modified computation (which may have yet to run).

== Examples ==
In Haskell, lists are a simple example of a functor. We may implement fmap as

fmap f []     = []
fmap f (x:xs) = (f x) : fmap f xs

A binary tree may similarly be described as a functor:

data Tree a = Leaf | Node a (Tree a) (Tree a)
instance Functor Tree where
   fmap f Leaf         = Leaf
   fmap f (Node x l r) = Node (f x) (fmap f l) (fmap f r)

If we have a binary tree tr :: Tree a and a function f :: a -> b, the function fmap f tr will apply f to every element of tr. For example, if a is Int, adding 1 to each element of tr can be expressed as fmap (+ 1) tr.

== See also ==
- Functor in category theory
- Applicative functor, a special type of functor
