= Functionalism =

Functionalism may refer to:

- Functionalism (aesthetics), a doctrine declaring that only objects based on utility and economy can be beautiful
  - Functionalism (architecture), the principle that architects should design a building based on the purpose of that building
- Functionalism in international relations, a theory that arose during the inter-War period
- Functional linguistics, a theoretical approach to the study of language
- Functionalism (philosophy of mind), a theory of the mind in contemporary philosophy
- Functionalism versus intentionalism, a historiographical debate about the origins of the Holocaust
- Structural functionalism, a theoretical tradition within sociology and anthropology
- Biological functionalism, an anthropological paradigm
- Functionalism (sociology of science), a concept due to Robert K. Merton

== See also ==
- Danish functional linguistics
- Functional (disambiguation)
- Functional psychology
- Neofunctionalism
