= Heinrich Kleisli =

Swiss mathematician (1930–2011)

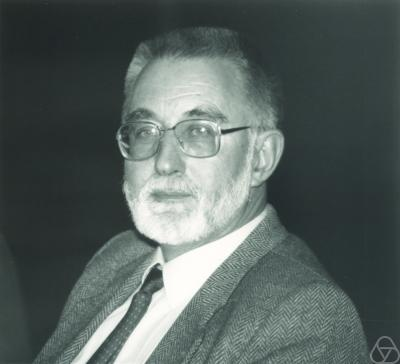
Heinrich Kleisli in 1987

Heinrich Kleisli (/ˈklaɪsli/; October 19, 1930 – April 5, 2011) was a Swiss mathematician. He is the namesake of several constructions in category theory, including the Kleisli category and Kleisli triples. He is also the namesake of the Kleisli Query System, a tool for integration of heterogeneous databases developed at the University of Pennsylvania.

Kleisli earned his Ph.D. at ETH Zurich in 1960, having been supervised by Beno Eckmann and Ernst Specker. His dissertation was on homotopy and abelian categories, aptly titled "Homotopy Theory in Abelian Categories". He served as an associate professor at the University of Ottawa before relocating to the University of Fribourg in 1966. He became a full professor at Fribourg in 1967.

== Selected publications ==
- Kleisli, H., Every standard construction is induced by a pair of adjoint functors (Proc. Amer. Math. Soc. 16, AMS 544-546) (1965)
