= Function field =

Function field may refer to:

- Function field of an algebraic variety
- Function field (scheme theory)
- Algebraic function field
- Function field sieve
- Function field analogy
