= Secretin receptor family =

Protein family

Secretin family of 7 transmembrane receptors

Identifiers
- Symbol: 7tm_2
- Pfam: PF00002
- InterPro: IPR000832
- PROSITE: PDOC00559
- TCDB: 9.A.14
- OPM superfamily: 6
- OPM protein: 4k5y
- CDD: cd13952
Available protein structures:
- PDB: IPR000832 PF00002 (ECOD; PDBsum)
- AlphaFold: IPR000832; PF00002

Secretin receptor family (class B GPCR subfamily) consists of secretin receptors regulated by peptide hormones from the glucagon hormone family. In early classifications, adhesion G protein-coupled receptors were included as part of the secretin receptor family, but in some more recent classification systems they are considered a distinct family (see for example: GRAFS).

The secretin-receptor family of GPCRs include vasoactive intestinal peptide receptors and receptors for secretin, calcitonin and parathyroid hormone/parathyroid hormone-related peptides. These receptors activate adenylyl cyclase and the phosphatidyl-inositol-calcium pathway. The receptors in this family have seven transmembrane helices, like rhodopsin-like GPCRs. However, there is no significant sequence identity between these two GPCR families and the secretin-receptor family has its own characteristic 7TM signature.

The secretin-receptor family GPCRs exist in many animal species. Data mining with the Pfam signature has identified members in fungi, although due to their presumed non-hormonal function they are more commonly referred to as Adhesion G protein-coupled receptors, making the Adhesion subfamily the more basal group. Three distinct sub-families (B1-B3) are recognized.

== Subfamily B1 ==
Subfamily B1 contains classical hormone receptors, such as receptors for secretin and glucagon, that are all involved in cAMP-mediated signalling pathways.

- Pituitary adenylate cyclase-activating polypeptide type 1 receptor InterPro: IPR002285
  - PACAPR (ADCYAP1R1)
- Calcitonin receptor InterPro: IPR003287
  - CALCR
- Calcitonin receptor-like receptor InterPro: IPR015476
  - CALCRL
- Corticotropin-releasing hormone receptor InterPro: IPR003051
  - CRHR1; CRHR2
- Glucose-dependent insulinotropic polypeptide receptor/Gastric inhibitory polypeptide receptor InterPro: IPR001749
  - GIPR
- Glucagon receptor InterPro: IPR003291
  - GCGR
- Glucagon receptor-related InterPro: IPR003290
  - GLP1R; GLP2R;
- Growth hormone releasing hormone receptor InterPro: IPR003288
  - GHRHR
- Parathyroid hormone receptor InterPro: IPR002170
  - PTHR1; PTHR2
- Secretin receptor InterPro: IPR002144
  - SCTR
- Vasoactive intestinal peptide receptor InterPro: IPR001571
  - VIPR1; VIPR2

== Subfamily B2 ==
Subfamily B2 (also known as the adhesion G protein-coupled receptor family) contains receptors with long extracellular N-termini, such as the leukocyte cell-surface antigen CD97; calcium-independent receptors for latrotoxin and brain-specific angiogenesis inhibitor receptors amongst others. However, in some more recent classifications, they are no longer considered part of the same family as secretin (due to significant differences, like autocatalytic processing and different cell functions).

- Brain-specific angiogenesis inhibitor InterPro: IPR008077
  - BAI1; BAI2; BAI3
- CD97 antigen InterPro: IPR003056
  - CD97
- EMR hormone receptor InterPro: IPR001740
  - CELSR1; CELSR2; CELSR3; EMR1; EMR2; EMR3; EMR4
- GPR56 orphan receptor InterPro: IPR003910
  - GPR56; GPR64; GPR97; GPR110; GPR111; GPR112; GPR113; GPR114; GPR115; GPR123; GPR125; GPR126; GPR128; GPR133; GPR144; GPR157
- Latrophilin receptor InterPro: IPR003924
  - ELTD1; LPHN1; LPHN2; LPHN3
- Ig-hepta receptor InterPro: IPR008078
  - GPR116

== Subfamily B3 ==
Subfamily B3 includes Methuselah and other Drosophila proteins. Other than the typical seven-transmembrane region, characteristic structural features include an amino-terminal extracellular domain involved in ligand binding, and an intracellular loop (IC3) required for specific G-protein coupling.

- Diuretic hormone receptor InterPro: IPR002001

== Unclassified members ==
HCTR-5; HCTR-6; KPG 006; KPG 008
