= EMR2 =

Protein-coding gene in the species Homo sapiens

ADGRE2
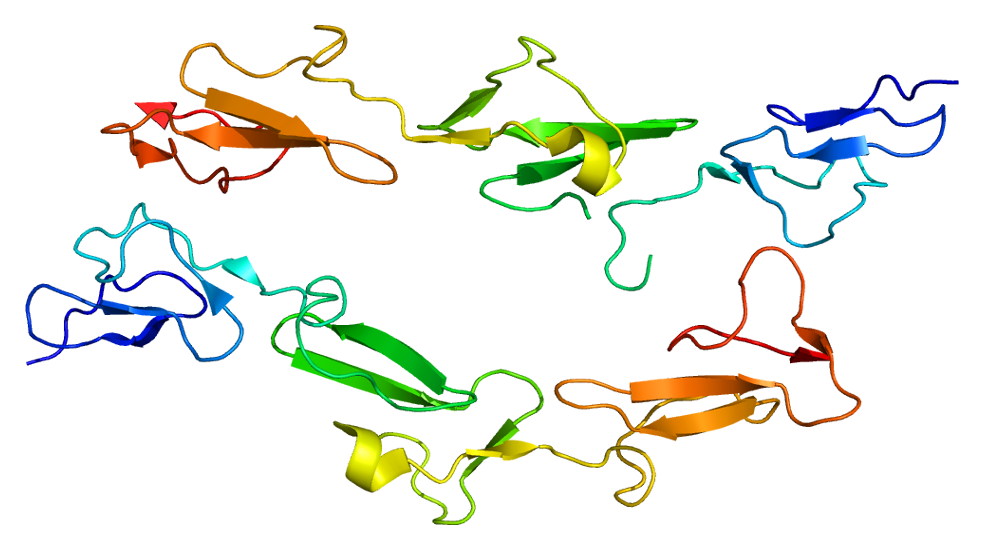

Identifiers
- Aliases: ADGRE2, CD312, VBU, EMR2, adhesion G protein-coupled receptor E2, CD97
- External IDs: OMIM: 606100; GeneCards: ADGRE2
Available structures
PDB	Human UniProt search: PDBe RCSB
PDB	List of PDB id codes 2BOX, 2BO2, 2BOU

Gene location (Human)
Chr.	Chromosome 19 (human)
Band	19p13.12	Start	14,732,392 bp
Band	19p13.12	End	14,778,560 bp
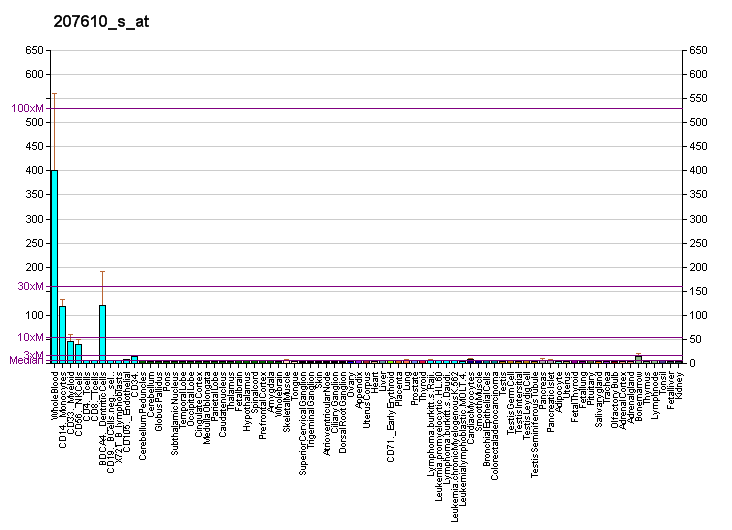
RNA expression pattern
Bgee	Human / Mouse (ortholog); Top expressed in: monocyte; blood; granulocyte; spleen; appendix; periodontal fiber; upper lobe of left lung; palpebral conjunctiva; right lung; gallbladder / n/a; More reference expression data
BioGPS	More reference expression data
Gene ontology
Molecular function	calcium ion binding; chondroitin sulfate binding; transmembrane signaling receptor activity; signal transducer activity; G protein-coupled receptor activity
Cellular component	ruffle membrane; plasma membrane; cell projection; membrane; leading edge membrane; integral component of membrane; intracellular anatomical structure; integral component of plasma membrane
Biological process	cell surface receptor signaling pathway; inflammatory response; cell migration; granulocyte chemotaxis; signal transduction; G protein-coupled receptor signaling pathway; cell adhesion; regulation of mast cell degranulation; adenylate cyclase-activating G protein-coupled receptor signaling pathway
Sources:Amigo / QuickGO
Orthologs
Databases	NCBI: entry; OMA: entry
Species	Human	Mouse
Entrez	30817	n/a
Ensembl	ENSG00000127507	n/a
UniProt	Q9UHX3	n/a
RefSeq (mRNA)	NM_001271052; NM_013447; NM_152916; NM_152917; NM_152918 NM_152919; NM_152920; NM_152921	n/a
RefSeq (protein)	NP_001257981; NP_038475	n/a
Location (UCSC)	Chr 19: 14.73 – 14.78 Mb	n/a
PubMed search		n/a
- Wikidata
View/Edit Human

EGF-like module-containing mucin-like hormone receptor-like 2 also known as CD312 (cluster of differentiation 312) is a protein encoded by the ADGRE2 gene. EMR2 is a member of the adhesion GPCR family. Adhesion GPCRs are characterized by an extended extracellular region often possessing N-terminal protein modules that is linked to a TM7 region via a domain known as the GPCR-Autoproteolysis INducing (GAIN) domain.

EMR2 is expressed by monocytes/macrophages, dendritic cells and all types of granulocytes. In the case of EMR2 the N-terminal domains consist of alternatively spliced epidermal growth factor-like (EGF-like) domains. EMR2 is closely related to CD97 with 97% amino-acid identity in the EGF-like domains. The N-terminal fragment (NTF) of EMR2 presents 2-5 EGF-like domains in human. Mice lack the Emr2 gene. This gene is closely linked to the gene encoding EGF-like molecule containing mucin-like hormone receptor 3 EMR3 on chromosome 19.

== Ligand ==
Like the related CD97 protein, the fourth EGF-like domain of EMR2 binds chondroitin sulfate B to mediate cell attachment. However, unlike CD97 EMR2 does not interact with the complement regulatory protein, decay accelerating factor CD55, and indicating that these very closely related proteins likely have nonredundant functions.

== Signaling ==
Inositol phosphate (IP3) accumulation assays in overexpressing HEK293 cells have demonstrated coupling of EMR2 to Gα_{15}. EGF-like module-containing mucin-like hormone receptor-like 2 (EMR2) is an adhesion GPCR that undergoes GPS autoproteolysis before being trafficked to the plasma membrane. Further, distribution, translocation, co-localization of the N-terminal fragment (NTF) and N-terminal fragment (CTF) of EMR2 within lipid rafts may affect cell signaling. Mutations in the GPS have shown that EMR2 does not need to undergo autoproteolysis to be trafficked, but loses function. EMR2 has been shown to be necessary for in vitro cell migration. Upon cleavage the N-terminus has been shown to associate with the 7TM, but to also dissociate, giving two possible functions. When the N-terminus dissociates it can be found in lipid rafts. Additionally, the cleaved EMR2 protein 7TM has been found to associate with EMR4 N-terminus.

== Function ==
The expression of EMR2 and CD97 on activated lymphocytes and myeloid cells promotes binding with their ligand chondroitin sulfate B on peripheral B cells, indicating a role in leukocyte interaction. The interaction between EMR2 and chondroitin sulfate B in inflamed rheumatoid synovial tissue suggests a role of the receptors in the recruitment and retention of leukocytes in synovium of arthritis patients. Upon neutrophil activation, EMR2 rapidly moves to membrane ruffles and the leading edge of the cell. Additionally, ligation of EMR2 by antibody promotes neutrophil and macrophage effector functions suggesting a role in potentiating inflammatory responses.

== Clinical significance ==
EMR2 is rarely expressed by tumor cell lines and tumors, but has been found on breast and colorectal adenocarcinoma. In breast cancer, robust expression and different distribution of EMR2 is inversely correlated with survival. Gain of function mutations within the GAIN domain of EMR2 of certain patient cohorts were shown to result in excessive degranulation by mast cells resulting in vibratory urticaria

== See also ==
- EGF module-containing mucin-like hormone receptor
