= DRC7 =

Protein found in humans

Identifiers
- Aliases: DRC7, C16orf50, CCDC135, CFAP50, FAP50, Coiled-coil domain-containing protein 135, dynein regulatory complex subunit 7
- External IDs: MGI: 2685616; GeneCards: DRC7

Gene location (Human)
Chr.	Chromosome 16 (human)
Band	16q21	Start	57,694,793 bp
Band	16q21	End	57,731,805 bp

Gene location (Mouse)
Chr.	Chromosome 8 (mouse)
Band	8|8 C5	Start	95,781,731 bp
Band	8|8 C5	End	95,804,769 bp
RNA expression pattern
Bgee	Human / Mouse (ortholog); Top expressed in: right uterine tube; bronchial epithelial cell; left testis; right testis; mucosa of paranasal sinus; testicle; olfactory zone of nasal mucosa; gonad; epithelium of nasopharynx; oocyte / Top expressed in: vasculature of organ; testicle; spermatid; choroid plexus; spermatocyte; choroid plexus of lateral ventricle; choroid plexus of fourth ventricle; hypothalamus; hippocampus proper; ovary; More reference expression data
BioGPS	n/a
Gene ontology
Molecular function	protein binding
Cellular component	cytoplasm; cell projection; motile cilium; cilium; cytoskeleton
Biological process	flagellated sperm motility; cell motility
Sources:Amigo / QuickGO
Orthologs
Databases	NCBI: entry; OMA: entry
Species	Human	Mouse
Entrez	84229	330830
Ensembl	ENSG00000159625	ENSMUSG00000031786
UniProt	Q8IY82	Q6V3W6
RefSeq (mRNA)	NM_001289162; NM_001289163; NM_032269	NM_001042715
RefSeq (protein)	NP_001276091; NP_001276092; NP_115645	NP_001036180
Location (UCSC)	Chr 16: 57.69 – 57.73 Mb	Chr 8: 95.78 – 95.8 Mb
PubMed search
- Wikidata
View/Edit Human	View/Edit Mouse

Dynein regulatory complex subunit 7 (DRC7) is a protein that in humans is encoded by the DRC7 gene (previously CCDC135).

== Gene ==
DRC7 is located on chromosome 16 in humans. It is neighbored by:

- GPR97, G protein-coupled receptor 97.
- GPR56, encodes a member of the G protein coupled receptor family (G protein-coupled receptor 56). The gene is implicated in the regulation of brain cortical patterning. The protein binds specifically to transglutaminase 2 in the extracellular space.
- KATNB1, katanin p80 subunit B 1. An accessory protein that helps targets the enzyme to the centrosome.
- KIFC3, kinesin family member C3 isoform 3. KIFC3 belongs to the large superfamily of kinesins, molecular motors that use the energy of ATP hydrolysis to translocate cargoes along microtubules.

== Protein ==
=== Structure ===
This protein is characterized by the presence of two domains.

- Nuclear localization sequence with a Score of 4 in the amino acids 265–279. The amino acid sequence for this region is:

KKQQEIRAQEKKRLR

- Transglutaminase-like family with an E Value of 0.0018 in the amino acids 149–308. The amino acid sequence for this region is:

CAQFVSDFLTMVPLPDPLKPPSHLYSSTTVLKYQKGNCFDFSTLLCSMLIGSGYDAYCVNGYGSLDLCHMDLTREVCPLTVKPKETIKKEEK VLPKKYTIKPPRDLCSRFEQEQEVKKQQEIRAQEKKRLREEEERLMEAEKAKPDALHGLRVHSWVLVL

The protein has 17 predicted alpha helices sites, a characteristic of coiled-coil proteins, and 1 predicted beta-pleated sheet. The following image shows the predicted regions of alpha helices and beta pleated sheets by two programs STRAP and Quickphyre: Note: the consensus secondary structures are shown. This was carried out by constructing a multiple sequence alignment of the proteins with their secondary structures (as shown below). The predicted regions were then cross checked with the Quickphyre Program.

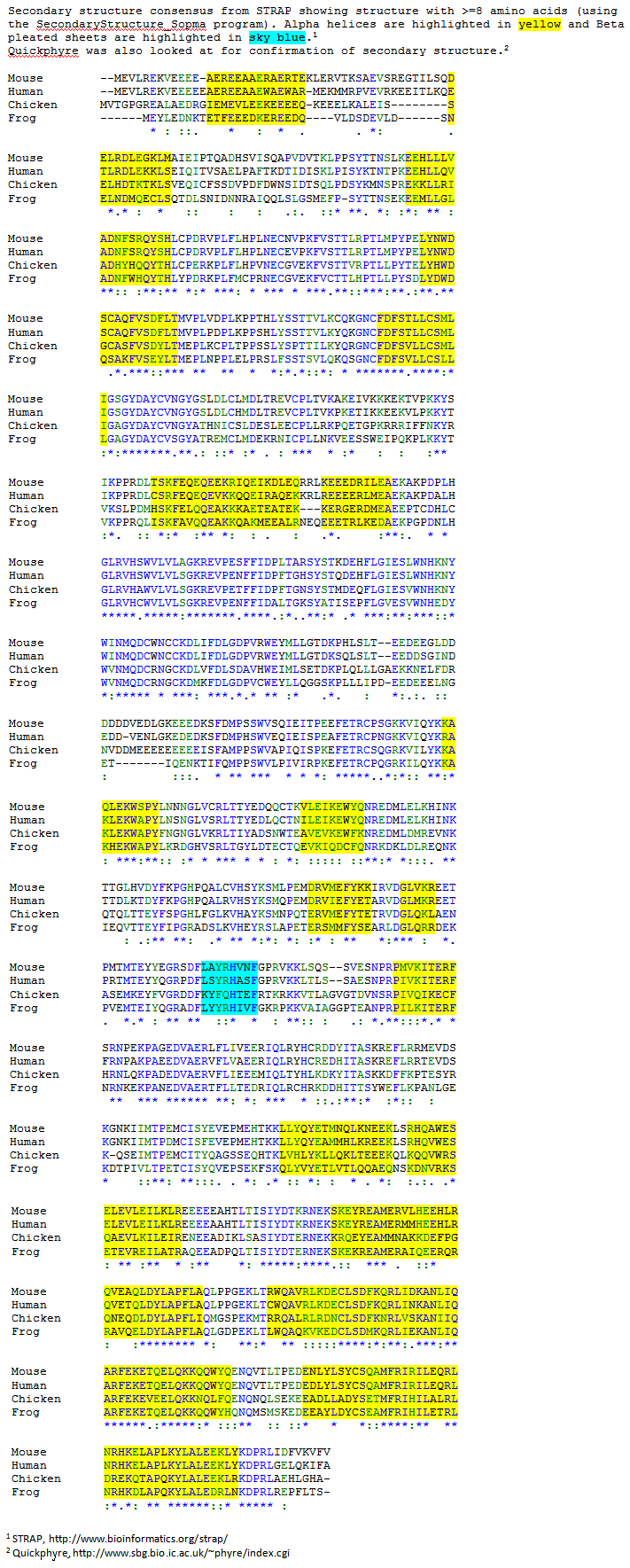

=== Homology ===
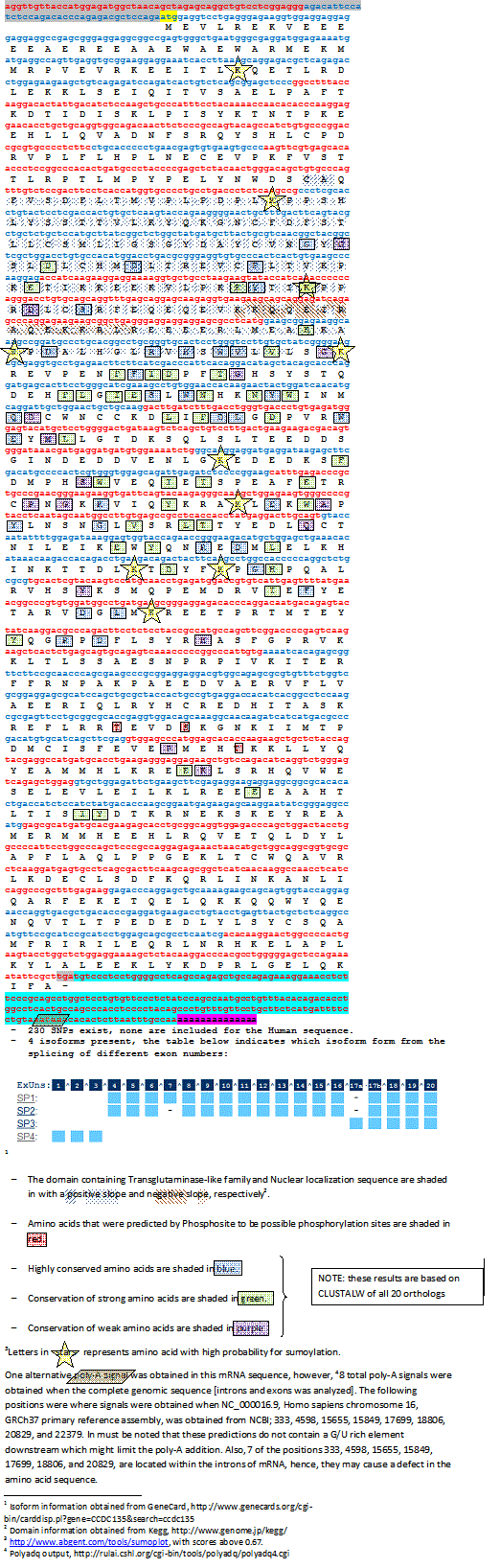
A sequence annotation of CCDC135.

LRRC57 is exceedingly well conserved, as shown in the sequence annotation to the right. The sequence annotation was created using 20 orthologs shown in the table below and was prepared using ClustalX2 and ClustalW (a tool at Biology Workbench).

The following table provides a few details on orthologs of the human version of CCDC135. These orthologs were gathered from BLAT. and BLAST searches

Species	Organism common name	NCBI accession	Sequence identity	Sequence similarity	Length (AAs)	Gene common name
Homo sapiens	Human	NP_115645.4	100%	100%	874	Homo sapiens coiled-coil domain containing 135 (CCDC135)
Macaca mulatta	Rhesus monkey	XP_001100628.1	96%	98%	830	Predicted: similar to chromosome 16 open reading frame 50
Bos taurus	Cow	NP_001033120.1	86%	93%	872	coiled-coil domain-containing protein 135
Canis familiaris	Dog	XP_544386.2	85%	92%	903	Predicted: similar to chromosome 16 open reading frame 50
Equus caballus	Horse	XP_001915581	81%	87%	831	Predicted: similar to Coiled-coil domain containing 135
Rattus norvegicus	Rat	NP_001099639	84%	91%	874	hypothetical protein LOC291853
Mus musculus	Mouse	NP_001036180	82%	90%	876	coiled-coil domain containing 135
Ornithorhynchus anatinus	Platypus	XP_001508368.1	71%	85%	860	Predicted: similar to Coiled-coil domain containing 135
Monodelphis domestica	Opossum	XP_001363193.1	70%	84%	866	Predicted: hypothetical protein isoform 1
Gallus gallus	Chicken	XP_425101.2	57%	72%	868	Predicted: hypothetical protein
Taeniopygia guttata	Zebra finch	XP_002195392.1	50%	67%	731	Predicted: hypothetical protein
Xenopus troicalis	Frog	NP_001072331.1	56%	71%	856	coiled-coil domain containing 135
Danio rerio	Zebrafish	XP_683491	46%	66%	721	Predicted: similar to Coiled-coil domain-containing protein 135
Tetraodon nigroviridis	Tetraodon	CAG07272	42%	59%	526	unnamed protein product
Nematostella vectensis	Sea anemone	XP_001632291	53%	70%	817	predicted protein
Branchiostoma floridae	Lancelet	XP_002610594	51%	71%	850	hypothetical protein BRAFLDRAFT_275841
Ciona intestinalis	Sea squirt	XP_002123665	49%	69%	837	Predicted: similar to coiled-coil domain containing 135
Anopheles gambiae	Mosquito	XP_312247.4	32%	49%	662	AGAP002677-PA
Nasonia vitripennis	Wasp	XP_001607094	34%	55%	868	Predicted: hypothetical protein
Drosophila melanogaster	Fruit fly	NP_001036757.1	28%	47%	897	CG34110

=== Predicted properties ===
- Molecular weight: 103502.53 = 103484.53 + 18 kDa
- Isoelectric point: 5.358000
- Transmembrane helices: None
- Post-translation modifications:

Chloroplast transit peptides: None
Signal pepties: Yes

Nuclear Localization Sequence: KKQQEIRAQEKKRLR

C-mannosylation sites: None (However, 14 sites with scores lower than the threshold were predicted.)
Mitochondrial targeting: None
N-glycosylation sites: Yes

Sequence gi|223941912 at positions 100 and 493 with potentials of 0.7200 and 0.6031 receptively.

=== Cellular location ===
CCDC135 is predicted to be a Cytosol/Nuclear protein with no transmembrane spans or segments. It is predicted to contain at least 56 specific phosphorylation sites which include: 20 Protein Kinase C Phosphorylation sites, 11 Casein Kinase II Phosphorylation sites, and 8 cAMP/cGMP Dependent Phosphorylation sites. The amino acid sequence is also predicted to contain 10 sumoylation sites at positions K236, K236, K45, K773, K499, K679, K249, K167, K540, K445, and K292.
