= Adhesion G protein-coupled receptor =

Class of 33 human protein receptors

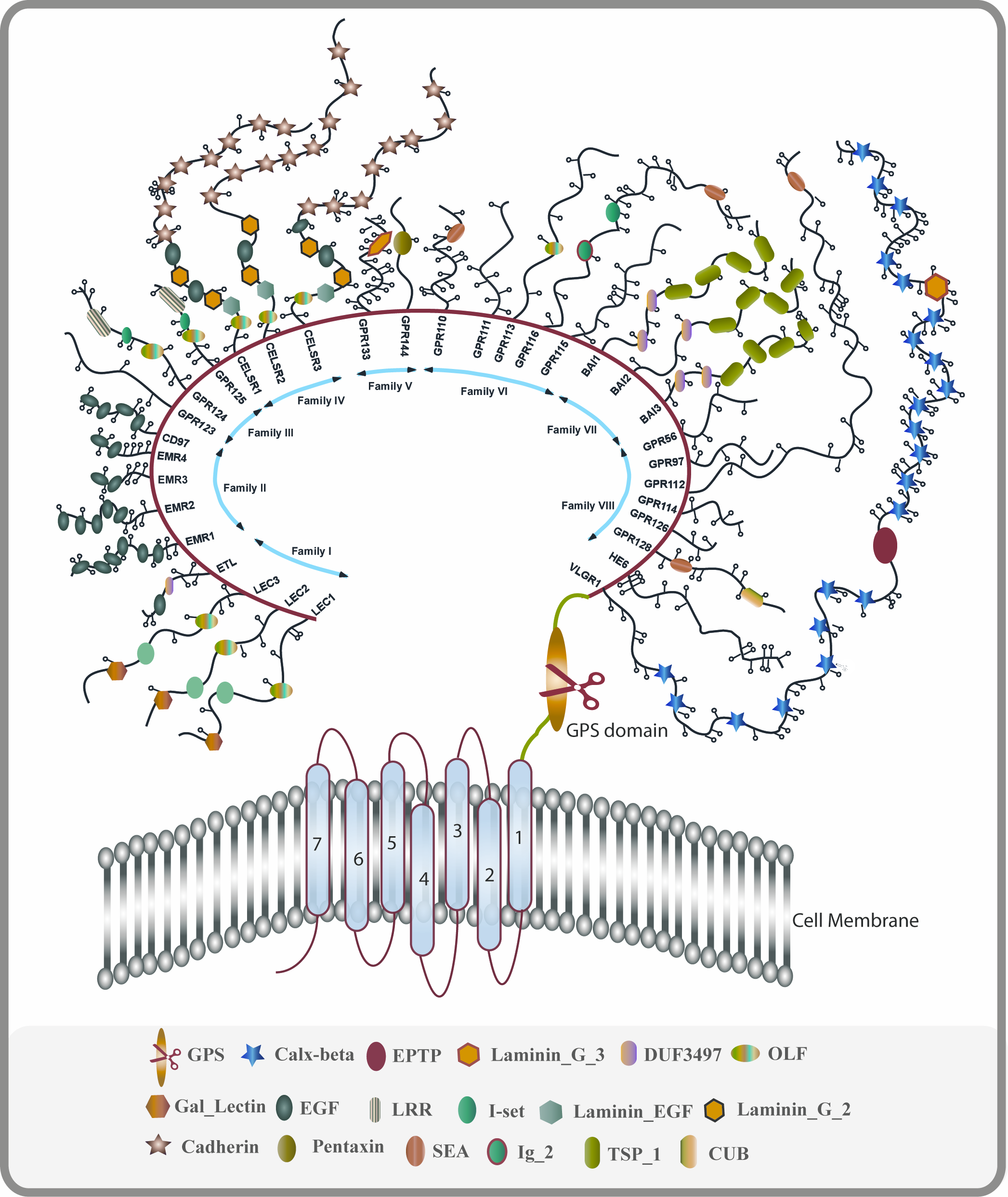
The human adhesion GPCR family. Members are defined by their unusual hybrid structure in which a large extracellular region often containing known protein modules is coupled to a seven span transmembrane region via a GPCR-Autoproteolysis INducing (GAIN) domain.

Adhesion G protein-coupled receptors (adhesion GPCRs) are a class of 33 human protein receptors with a broad distribution in embryonic and larval cells, cells of the reproductive tract, neurons, leukocytes, and a variety of tumours. Adhesion GPCRs are found throughout metazoans and are also found in single-celled colony forming choanoflagellates such as Monosiga brevicollis and unicellular organisms such as Filasterea. The defining feature of adhesion GPCRs that distinguishes them from other GPCRs is their hybrid molecular structure. The extracellular region of adhesion GPCRs can be exceptionally long and contain a variety of structural domains that are known for the ability to facilitate cell and matrix interactions. Their extracellular region contains the membrane proximal GAIN (GPCR-Autoproteolysis INducing) domain. Crystallographic and experimental data has shown this structurally conserved domain to mediate autocatalytic processing at a GPCR-proteolytic site (GPS) proximal to the first transmembrane helix. Autocatalytic processing gives rise to an extracellular (α) and a membrane-spanning (β) subunit, which are associated non-covalently, resulting in expression of a heterodimeric receptor at the cell surface. Ligand profiles and in vitro studies have indicated a role for adhesion GPCRs in cell adhesion and migration. Work utilizing genetic models confined this concept by demonstrating that the primary function of adhesion GPCRs may relate to the proper positioning of cells in a variety of organ systems. Moreover, growing evidence implies a role of adhesion GPCRs in tumour cell metastasis. Formal G protein-coupled signalling has been demonstrated for a number for adhesion GPCRs, however, the orphan receptor status of many of the receptors still hampers full characterisation of potential signal transduction pathways. In 2011, the adhesion GPCR consortium was established to facilitate research of the physiological and pathological functions of adhesion GPCRs.

== Classification ==
The GPCR superfamily is the largest gene family in the human genome containing approximately 800 genes. As the vertebrate superfamily can be phylogenetically grouped into five main families, the GRAFS classification system has been proposed, which includes the glutamate, rhodopsin, adhesion, Frizzled/Taste2, and secretin GPCR families.

There are 33 human adhesion GPCRs that can be broken down into eight groups, with two independent receptors. Group I consists of LPHN1, LPHN2, LPHN3, and ETL. Group II consists of CD97, EMR1, EMR2, EMR3, and EMR4. Group III consists of GPR123, GPR124, and GPR125. Group IV consists of CELSR1, CELSR2, and CELSR3. Group V consists of GPR133 and GPR144. Group VI consists of GPR110, GPR111, GPR113, GPR115, and GPR116. Group VII consists of BAI1, BAI2, and BAI3. Group VIII consists of GPR56, GPR97, GPR112, GPR114, GPR126, and GPR64. Two additional adhesion GPCRs do not fit into these groups: VLGR1 and GPR128.

== Non-humans and evolution ==
Adhesion GPCRs are found in fungi. They are believed to have evolved from the cAMP receptor family, arising approximately 1275 million years ago before the split of Unikonts from a common ancestor. Several fungi have novel adhesion GPCRs that have both short, 2–66 amino acid residues, and long, 312–4202 amino acid residues. Analysis of fungi showed that there were no secretin receptor family GPCRs, which suggests that they evolved from adhesion GPCRs in a later organism.

Genome analysis of the Teleost Takifugu rubripes has revealed that it has only two adhesion GPCRs that showed homology to Ig-hepta/GPR116. While the Fugu genome is relatively compact and limited with the number of adhesion GPCRs, Tetraodon nigroviridis, another species of puffer fish, has considerably more, totaling 29 adhesion GPCRs.

== Ligands ==
A majority of the adhesion GPCRs are orphan receptors and work is underway to de-orphanize many of these receptors. Adhesion GPCRs get their name from their N-terminal domains that have adhesion-like domains, such as EGF, and the belief that they interact cell to cell and cell to extra cellular matrix. While ligands for many receptors are still not known, researchers are utilizing drug libraries to investigate compounds that can activate GPCRs and using these data for future ligand research.

One adhesion GPCR, GPR56, has a known ligand, collagen III, which is involved in neural migration inhibition. GPR56 has been shown to be the cause of polymicrogyria in humans and may play a role in cancer metastasis. The binding of collagen III to GPR56 occurs on the N-terminus and has been narrowed down to a short stretch of amino acids. The N-terminus of GPR56 is naturally glycosylated, but this glycosylation is not necessary for collagen III binding. Collagen III, results in GPR56 to signal through Gα12/13 activating RhoA.

== Signaling ==
Adhesion GPCRs appear capable to follow standard GPCR signaling modes and signal through Gαs, Gαq, Gαi, and Gα12/13. As of today, many of the adhesion GPCRs are still orphan receptors and their signalling pathways have not been identified. Research groups are working to elucidate the downstream signaling molecules utilizing several methods, including chemical screens and analysis of second messenger levels in over-expressed cells. Adding drugs in vitro, while the cells are over-expressing an adhesion GPCR, has allowed the identification of the molecules activating the GPCR and the second messengers being utilized.

GPR133 signals through Gαs to activate adenylyl cyclase. It has been shown that overexpressing GPCRs in vitro can result in receptor activation in the absence of a ligand or agonist. By over expressing GPR133 in vitro, an elevation in reporter genes and cAMP was observed. Signaling of the overexpressed GPR133 did not require an N-terminus or GPS cleavage. Missense mutations in the 7TM region resulted in loss of signalling.

The latrophilin homolog LPHN1 was shown in C. elegans to require a GPS for signaling, but cleavage at the GPS site was not necessary. Furthermore, having a shortened 7 transmembrane domain, but with an intact GPS domain, resulted in a loss of signaling. This suggests that having both the GPS and 7 transmembrane domain intact is involved in signaling and that the GPS site could act as or be a necessary part of an endogenous ligand.

GPR56 has been shown to be cleaved at the GPS site and then remain associated with the 7TM domain. In a study where the N-terminus was removed up to N342 (the start of the GPS), the receptor became constitutively active and an up regulation of Gα12/13 was seen. When receptors are active, they are ubiquitinated and GPR56 lacking an N-terminus was highly ubiquitinated.

== Cleavage ==
Many adhesion GPCRs undergo proteolytic events posttranslationally at highly conserved Cys-rich motifs known as GPCR proteolysis sites (GPS), located next to the first transmembrane region. This site is called the HL-S(T) site. Once this protein is cleaved, the pieces are expressed at the cell surface as a heterodimer. This cleavage is thought to happen from within the protein itself, through the conserved GAIN domain. This process seems to be similar to those found in other auto-proteolytic proteins such as the Ntn hydrolases and hedgehog proteins. More recently proteins with structural homology to GAIN domains have been demonstrate to be broadly conserved among both bacteria and archaea. Although lacking strong sequence conservation to eukaryotic GAIN domains these MAIN (Microbial Autoproteolysis INducing) domains are predicted to adopt a similar fold and have been demonstrated to undergo autoproteolysis. Similar to their eukaryotic counterparts MAIN domains are found fused to adhesion ectodomains providing a potentially conserved mechnosensing mechanism across all three domains of life.

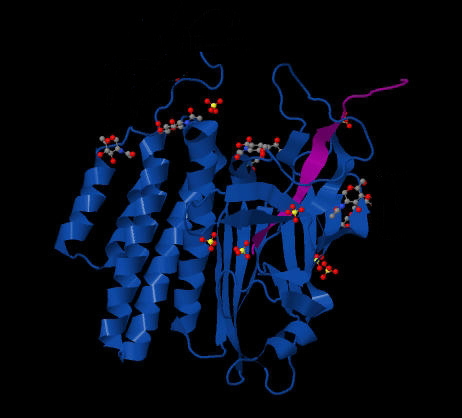
GPCR-Autoproteolysis INducing (GAIN) domain, rat latrophilin 4DLQ mediates autocatalytic cleavage of adhesion GPCRs

== Domains ==
One characteristic of adhesion GPCRs is their extended extracellular region. This region is modular in nature, often possessing a variety of structurally defined protein domains and a membrane proximal GAIN domain. In the aptly named Very Large G protein-coupled Receptor 1 VLGR1 the extracellular region extends up to almost 6000 amino acids. Human adhesion GPCRs possess domains including EGF-like (Pfam PF00053), Cadherin (Pfam PF00028), thrombospondin (Pfam PF00090), Immunoglobulin (Pfam PF00047), Pentraxin (Pfam PF00354), Calx-beta (Pfam PF03160) and Leucine-rich repeats (Pfam PF00560). In non-vertebrate species multiple other structural motifs including Kringle, Somatomedin B (Pfam PF01033), SRCR (Pfam PF00530) may be contained with the extracellular region. Since many of these domains have been demonstrated to mediate protein-protein interactions within other proteins, they are believed to play the same role in adhesion GPCRs. Indeed, many ligands have been discovered for adhesion GPCRs (see ligands section). Many of the adhesion GPCR possess long stretches of amino acids with little homology to known protein domains suggesting the possibility of new structural domains being elucidated within their extracellular regions.

== Roles ==
=== Immune system ===
A number of adhesion GPCRs may have important roles within the immune system. In particular, members the EGF-TM7 subfamily which possess N-terminal EGF-like domains are predominantly restricted to leukocytes suggesting a putative role in immune function. The human EGF‑TM7 family is composed of CD97, EMR1 (F4/80 receptor orthologue) EMR2, EMR3 and EMR4 (a probable pseudogene in humans). The human-restricted EMR2 receptor, is expressed by myeloid cells including monocytes, dendritic cells and neutrophils has been shown to be involved in the activation and migration of human neutrophils and upregulated in patients with systemic inflammatory response syndrome (SIRS). Details of EMR1, CD97 needed. The adhesion‑GPCR brain angiogenesis inhibitor 1 (BAI1) acts as a phosphatidylserine receptor playing a potential role in the binding and clearance of apoptotic cells, and the phagocytosis of Gram-negative bacteria. GPR56 has been shown to a marker for inflammatory NK cell subsets and to be expressed by cytotoxic lymphocytes.

=== Neuronal development ===
GPR126 is necessary for Schwann cell myelination. Knockouts of this adhesion GPCR in both Danio rerio and Mus musculus result in an arrest at the promyelinating stage. Schwann cells arise from the neural crest, which migrates to peripheral nerves to form either myelinating or non-myelinating cells. In GPR126 knockouts, these precursor cells develop to the promyelinating stage, where they have wrapped approximately 1.5 times. Myelination is arrested at the promyelinating stage and in fish no myelin basic protein can be detected. In fish this can be rescued by adding forskolin during development, which rescues myelin basic protein expression.

=== Bone marrow and hematapoietic stem cells ===
GPR56 may play a role in the interactions between bone marrow and hematopoietic stem cells.

=== Disease ===
Loss of function mutations have been shown in a number of adhesion GPCRs, including GPR56, GPR126 and VLRG1. Many mutations affect function via decreased cell surface expression or inhibition of autoproteolysis within the GAIN domain. Mutations in GPR56 result in bilateral frontoparietal polymicrogyria in humans, characterized by abnormal neuronal migration and surface ectopias., Variants of GPR126 have been associated with adolescent idiopathic scoliosis, as well as being responsible for severe arthrogryposis multiplex congenita. Gain of function mutations within the GAIN domain of EMR2 have been shown to result in excessive degranulation by mast cells resulting in vibratory urticaria.
