= Pancreatic islet macrophage =

Pancreatic Islet Macrophage
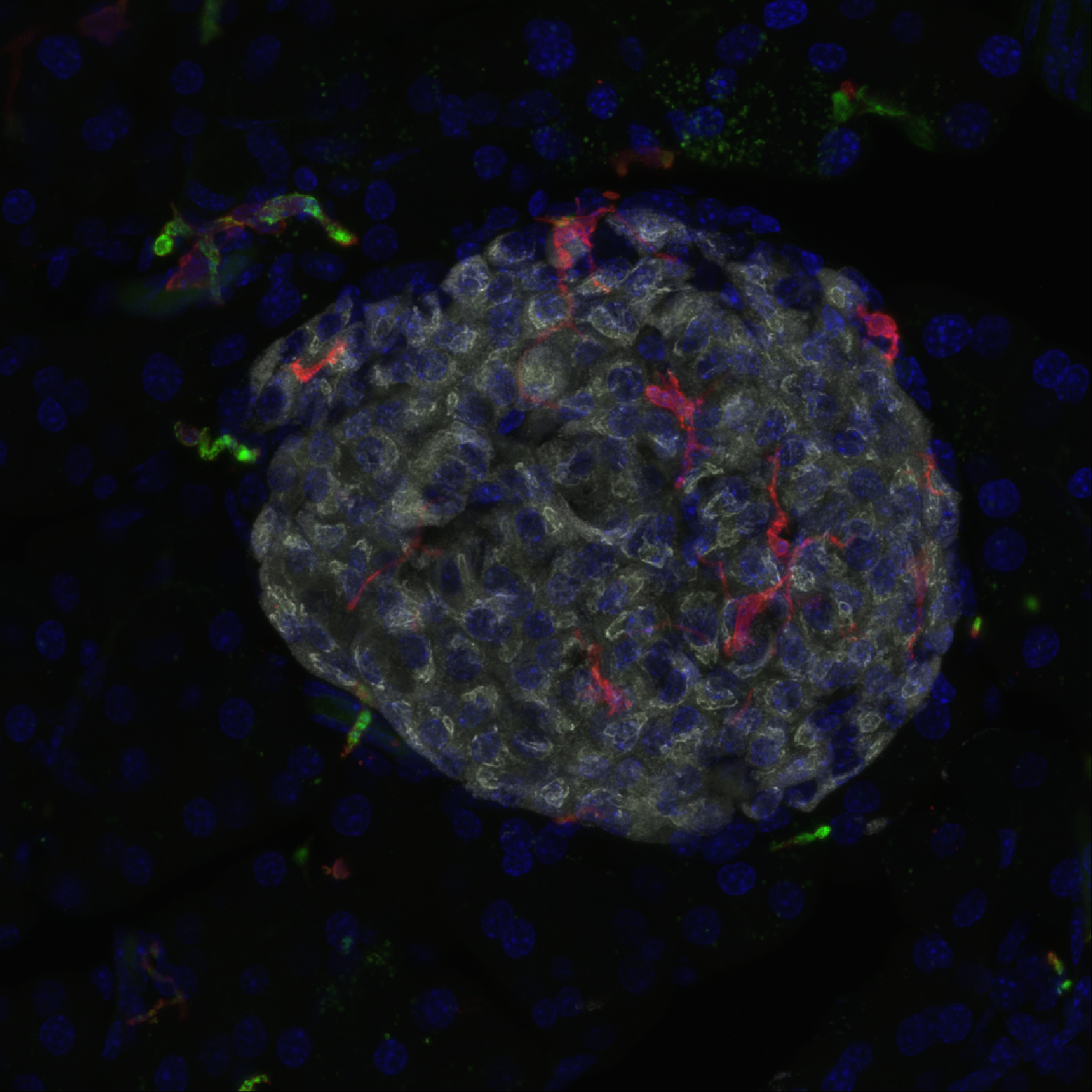
- Immunohistochemistry for a pancreatic islet (white) with macrophages (green and red), and cell nuclei (blue)

Details
- Precursor: Hematopoietic Stem Cell
- System: Immune system
- Location: Pancreatic islet

Identifiers
- Latin: pancreaticae insulae macrophagocytus
- TH: H2.00.01.0.00005

Islet resident macrophages are the predominant myeloid cell of the pancreatic islets of langerhans.

== Structure ==
=== Markers ===
Islet resident macrophages are uniquely found within the endocrine tissue (islet), while nearby in the nearby acinar tissue, macrophages express a different repertoire of CD (cluster of differentiation) markers and come from a different developmental origin. In terms of expression markers, islet macrophages are positive for; F4/80, CD11b, CD11c, MHC-II, CD64, CD68, LyzM (lysozyme), Cx3cr1 and are negative for; CD206 (mannose receptor), CD301, CD103.

=== Development ===
The mesoderm gives rise to myeloid progenitor cells, which further differentiate into macrophage populations. As opposed to macrophages in the islet stroma (tissue), whose developmental origin is from the yolk sac (primitive hematopoiesis), islet resident progenitors come from hematopoietic stem cells (HSCs) of the definitive hematopoiesis. These cells are seen in fetal liver during mid-gestation E10-E11, and are thought to colonize the bone marrow during late gestation E15. As a unique population in terms of developmental origin, these resident macrophages have a unique phenotype in which they are long lived, self-renew locally, and stay confined within the islet parenchyma.

== Function ==
Islet resident macrophages depend on the expression of colony stimulating factor (CSF1). Knockout mice for the CSF-1 gene cause islets to be devoid of resident macrophages. These mice show a reduced beta cell mass as well as developmental defects. This as well as other observations, showing that islet resident macrophages promote beta cell proliferation suggest that islet macrophages are likely important contributors to the function of the pancreatic islet. In contrast to the possible supportive role within the islet, these specialized macrophages are also required for the initiation of the adaptive immune response during type 1 diabetes (T1D) in mice. They do this by presenting beta cell derived peptides using MHC II receptors to T-cells in the islet. Once activated, T-cells stimulate the adaptive immune system, which leads to the destruction of pancreatic islets due to an autoimmune response.

== History ==
The islet resident macrophage was first identified in 1979 as an antigen-presenting cell (APC), which expresses major histocompatibility complexes (MHCs). Later in 1984 this APC was further classified by using a macrophage specific marker F4/80. In 1988 it was discovered that macrophages play an essential role in the progression of insulin dependent diabetes mellitus (T1D), in an animal model for non-obese diabetes (NOD mice). The role of pancreatic macrophages were later shown to play an important role in type 2 diabetes as well, by contributing to islet inflammation. The origin and turnover in the normal state was characterized by Emil Unanue in 2015.

== See also ==
- Pancreas
- Macrophage
- Islet of Langerhans
- Microglia
