= ADGRD2 =

Protein-coding gene in the species Homo sapiens

Identifiers
- Aliases: ADGRD2, PGR24, GPR144, adhesion G protein-coupled receptor D2
- External IDs: GeneCards: ADGRD2

Gene location (Human)
| Chr. | Chromosome 9 (human) |
| Band | 9q33.3 | Start | 124,450,451 bp |
| Band | 9q33.3 | End | 124,478,589 bp |
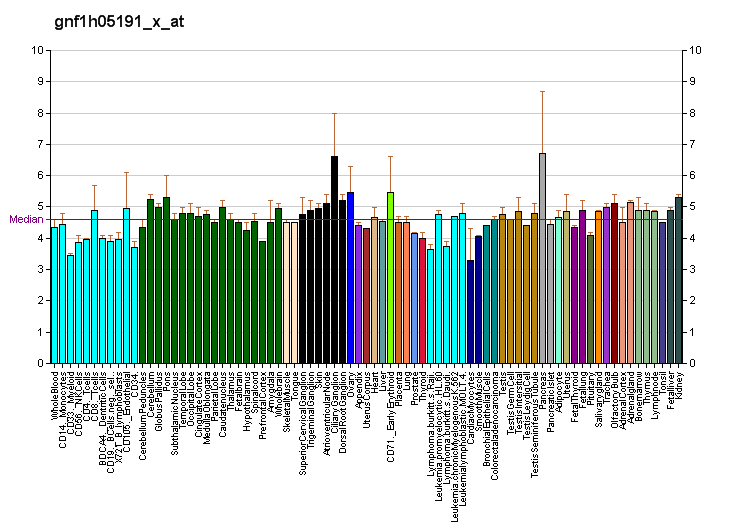
RNA expression pattern
| Bgee | Human / Mouse (ortholog); Top expressed in: parotid gland; triceps brachii muscle; vena cava; right ventricle; dorsal motor nucleus of vagus nerve; pituitary gland; anterior pituitary; lateral nuclear group of thalamus; inferior olivary nucleus; cerebellar vermis / n/a; More reference expression data |
| BioGPS | More reference expression data |
Gene ontology
| Molecular function | G protein-coupled receptor activity; transmembrane signaling receptor activity; signal transducer activity |
| Cellular component | integral component of membrane; membrane; intracellular anatomical structure; integral component of plasma membrane |
| Biological process | G protein-coupled receptor signaling pathway; cell surface receptor signaling pathway; signal transduction; adenylate cyclase-activating G protein-coupled receptor signaling pathway |
Sources:Amigo / QuickGO
Orthologs
| Databases | NCBI: entry; OMA: entry |
| Species | Human | Mouse |
| Entrez | 347088 | n/a |
| Ensembl | ENSG00000180264 | n/a |
| UniProt | Q7Z7M1 | n/a |
| RefSeq (mRNA) | NM_001161808; NM_182611; NM_001395425 | n/a |
| RefSeq (protein) | n/a | n/a |
| Location (UCSC) | Chr 9: 124.45 – 124.48 Mb | n/a |
| PubMed search | | n/a |
- Wikidata
| View/Edit Human |

Adhesion G protein-coupled receptor D2 is a protein that in humans is encoded by the ADGRD2 gene (previously GPR144). The ADGRD2 protein is an orphan receptor which is a member of the adhesion-GPCR family of receptors. Family members are characterised by an extended extracellular region with a variable number of protein domains coupled to a TM7 domain via a domain known as the GPCR-Autoproteolysis INducing (GAIN) domain.
