= ADGRG5 =

Protein-coding gene in the species Homo sapiens

Identifiers
- Aliases: ADGRG5, PGR27, GPR114, adhesion G protein-coupled receptor G5
- External IDs: OMIM: 616965; MGI: 2685955; GeneCards: ADGRG5

Gene location (Human)
Chr.	Chromosome 16 (human)
Band	16q21	Start	57,542,643 bp
Band	16q21	End	57,591,681 bp

Gene location (Mouse)
Chr.	Chromosome 8 (mouse)
Band	8|8 C5	Start	95,650,322 bp
Band	8|8 C5	End	95,669,908 bp
RNA expression pattern
Bgee	Human / Mouse (ortholog); Top expressed in: granulocyte; lymph node; blood; testicle; islet of Langerhans; spleen; bone marrow cell; appendix; epithelium of nasopharynx; tonsil / Top expressed in: mesenteric lymph nodes; secondary oocyte; primary oocyte; spleen; embryo; thymus; jejunum; zygote; blood; subcutaneous adipose tissue; More reference expression data
BioGPS	n/a
Gene ontology
Molecular function	G protein-coupled receptor activity; transmembrane signaling receptor activity; signal transducer activity
Cellular component	integral component of membrane; membrane; plasma membrane; intracellular anatomical structure; integral component of plasma membrane
Biological process	G protein-coupled receptor signaling pathway; cell surface receptor signaling pathway; signal transduction; adenylate cyclase-activating G protein-coupled receptor signaling pathway
Sources:Amigo / QuickGO
Orthologs
Databases	NCBI: entry; OMA: entry
Species	Human	Mouse
Entrez	221188	382045
Ensembl	ENSG00000159618	ENSMUSG00000061577
UniProt	Q8IZF4	Q3V3Z3
RefSeq (mRNA)	NM_001304376; NM_153837; NM_001318481	NM_001033468; NM_001145972
RefSeq (protein)	NP_001291305; NP_001305410; NP_722579	NP_001028640; NP_001139444
Location (UCSC)	Chr 16: 57.54 – 57.59 Mb	Chr 8: 95.65 – 95.67 Mb
PubMed search
- Wikidata
View/Edit Human	View/Edit Mouse

Adhesion G protein-coupled receptor G5 is a protein that in humans is encoded by the ADGRG5 gene (previously GPR114). The ADGRG5 protein is a member of the adhesion GPCR family. Adhesion GPCRs are characterized by an extended extracellular region often possessing N-terminal protein modules that is linked to a TM7 region via a domain known as the GPCR-Autoproteolysis INducing (GAIN) domain.

== Tissue distribution ==
ADGRG5 mRNA is specifically expressed in human eosinophils as well as in mouse lymphocytes, monocytes, macrophage, and dendritic cells.

== Signaling ==
The cyclic adenosine monophosphate (cAMP) assay in overexpressing HEK293 cells has demonstrated coupling of ADGRG5 to G_{αs} protein.
