= Latrophilin 1 =

Protein-coding gene in the species Homo sapiens

ADGRL1

Identifiers
- Aliases: ADGRL1, CIRL1, CL1, LEC2, LPHN1, adhesion G protein-coupled receptor L1
- External IDs: OMIM: 616416; MGI: 1929461; GeneCards: ADGRL1
Available structures
PDB	Ortholog search: PDBe RCSB
PDB	List of PDB id codes 2JX9, 2JXA

Gene location (Human)
Chr.	Chromosome 19 (human)
Band	19p13.12	Start	14,147,743 bp
Band	19p13.12	End	14,206,187 bp

Gene location (Mouse)
Chr.	Chromosome 8 (mouse)
Band	8|8 C2	Start	83,900,105 bp
Band	8|8 C2	End	83,941,954 bp
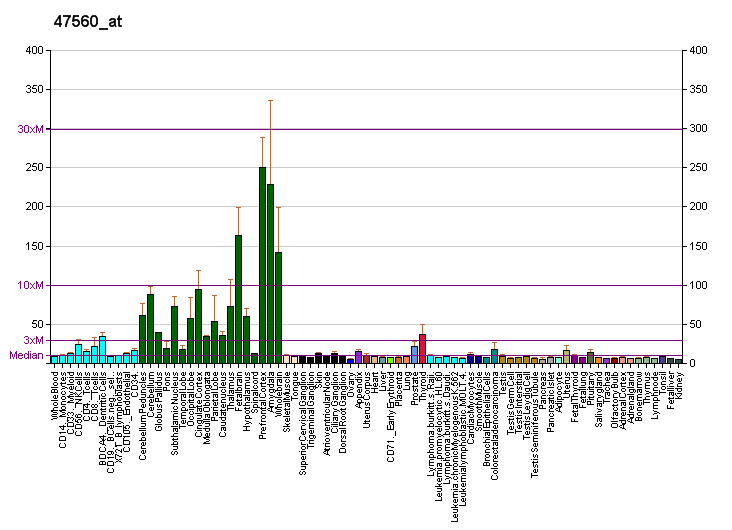

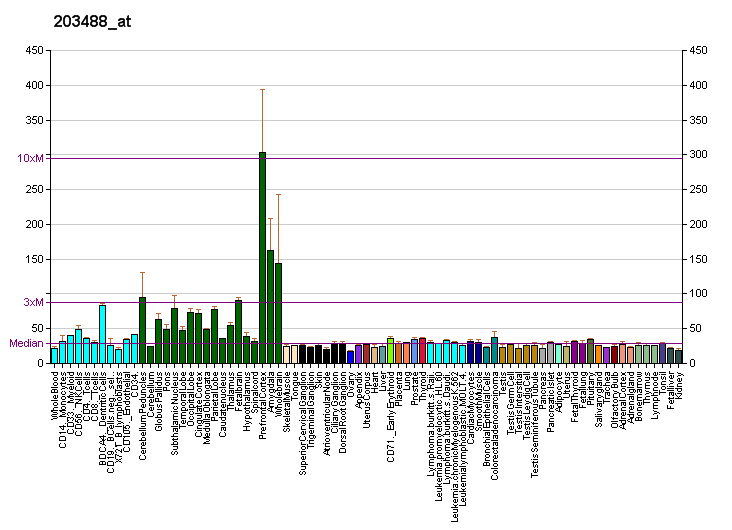

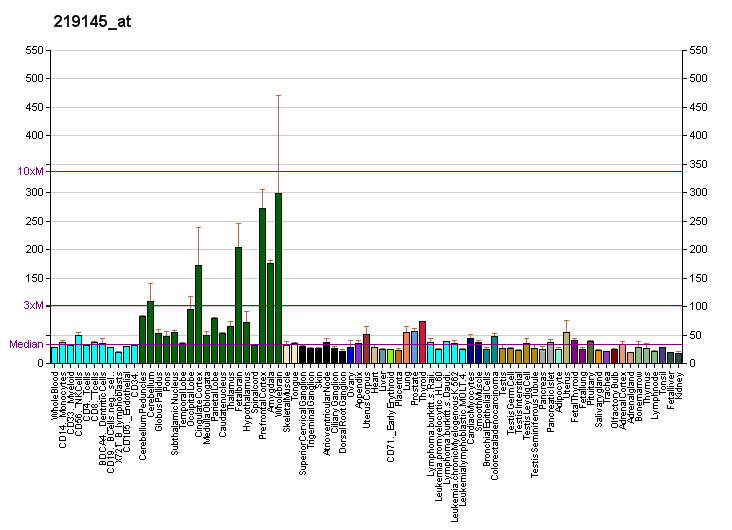
RNA expression pattern
Bgee	Human / Mouse (ortholog); Top expressed in: right hemisphere of cerebellum; superior frontal gyrus; primary visual cortex; right frontal lobe; prefrontal cortex; dorsolateral prefrontal cortex; anterior cingulate cortex; Brodmann area 9; hippocampus proper; temporal lobe / Top expressed in: CA3 field; primary visual cortex; entorhinal cortex; perirhinal cortex; superior frontal gyrus; dentate gyrus of hippocampal formation granule cell; prefrontal cortex; nucleus accumbens; primary motor cortex; cerebellar cortex; More reference expression data
BioGPS	More reference expression data
Gene ontology
Molecular function	G protein-coupled receptor activity; signal transducer activity; protein binding; transmembrane signaling receptor activity; cell adhesion molecule binding; carbohydrate binding; latrotoxin receptor activity
Cellular component	integral component of membrane; cell projection; membrane; growth cone; plasma membrane; synapse; cell junction; axon; neuron projection; presynaptic membrane; intracellular anatomical structure; integral component of plasma membrane; postsynaptic density
Biological process	G protein-coupled receptor signaling pathway; cell surface receptor signaling pathway; calcium-mediated signaling using intracellular calcium source; signal transduction; positive regulation of synapse assembly; heterophilic cell-cell adhesion via plasma membrane cell adhesion molecules; positive regulation of synapse maturation; adenylate cyclase-activating G protein-coupled receptor signaling pathway
Sources:Amigo / QuickGO
Orthologs
Databases	NCBI: entry; OMA: entry
Species	Human	Mouse
Entrez	22859	330814
Ensembl	ENSG00000072071; ENSG00000288324	ENSMUSG00000013033
UniProt	O94910	Q80TR1
RefSeq (mRNA)	NM_001008701; NM_014921	NM_181039
RefSeq (protein)	NP_001008701; NP_055736	NP_851382
Location (UCSC)	Chr 19: 14.15 – 14.21 Mb	Chr 8: 83.9 – 83.94 Mb
PubMed search
- Wikidata
View/Edit Human	View/Edit Mouse

Latrophilin 1 is a protein that in humans is encoded by the ADGRL1 gene. It is a member of the adhesion-GPCR family of receptors. Family members are characterized by an extended extracellular region with a variable number of protein domains coupled to a TM7 domain via a domain known as the GPCR-Autoproteolysis INducing (GAIN) domain.

== Function ==
This gene encodes a member of the latrophilin subfamily of G protein-coupled receptors (GPCR). Latrophilins may function in both cell adhesion and signal transduction. In experiments with non-human species, endogenous proteolytic cleavage within a cysteine-rich GPS (G-protein-coupled-receptor proteolysis site) domain resulted in two subunits (a large extracellular N-terminal cell adhesion subunit and a subunit with substantial similarity to the secretin/calcitonin family of GPCRs) being non-covalently bound at the cell membrane. Latrophilin-1 has been shown to recruit the neurotoxin from black widow spider venom, alpha-latrotoxin, to the synapse plasma membrane. Latrophilin-1 is involved in glucose sensing in the brain and regulating glucose intake.

== See also ==
- Adhesion G protein-coupled receptors
