= ADGRG4 =

Protein-coding gene in humans

Identifiers
- Aliases: ADGRG4, PGR17, RP1-299I16, GPR112, adhesion G protein-coupled receptor G4
- External IDs: MGI: 2685213; GeneCards: ADGRG4

Gene location (Human)
Chr.	X chromosome (human)
Band	Xq26.3	Start	136,300,963 bp
Band	Xq26.3	End	136,416,890 bp

Gene location (Mouse)
Chr.	X chromosome (mouse)
Band	X|X A6	Start	55,915,523 bp
Band	X|X A6	End	56,046,918 bp
RNA expression pattern
Bgee	Human / Mouse (ortholog); Top expressed in: duodenum; jejunal mucosa; left uterine tube; gastric mucosa; Achilles tendon; urinary bladder; body of uterus; right coronary artery; fundus; tibial arteries / Top expressed in: proximal tubule; secondary oocyte; primary oocyte; zygote; right kidney; human kidney; embryo; duodenum; jejunum; placenta; More reference expression data
BioGPS	n/a
Gene ontology
Molecular function	G protein-coupled receptor activity; transmembrane signaling receptor activity; signal transducer activity
Cellular component	integral component of membrane; membrane; intracellular anatomical structure; integral component of plasma membrane
Biological process	G protein-coupled receptor signaling pathway; cell surface receptor signaling pathway; signal transduction; adenylate cyclase-activating G protein-coupled receptor signaling pathway
Sources:Amigo / QuickGO
Orthologs
Databases	NCBI: entry; OMA: entry
Species	Human	Mouse
Entrez	139378	236798
Ensembl	ENSG00000156920	ENSMUSG00000053852
UniProt	Q8IZF6	n/a
RefSeq (mRNA)	NM_153834	NM_001033327; NM_001110790; NM_001362885
RefSeq (protein)	NP_722576	n/a
Location (UCSC)	Chr X: 136.3 – 136.42 Mb	Chr X: 55.92 – 56.05 Mb
PubMed search
- Wikidata
View/Edit Human	View/Edit Mouse

Adhesion G protein-coupled receptor G4 is a protein that in humans is encoded by the ADGRG4 gene (previously GPR112). ADGRG4 is a member of the adhesion GPCR family. Adhesion GPCRs are characterized by an extended extracellular region often possessing N-terminal protein modules that is linked to a TM7 region via a domain known as the GPCR-Autoproteolysis INducing (GAIN) domain.

ADGRG4 is expressed in human enterochromaffin cells and in the mouse intestine. The N-terminal fragment (NTF) of ADGRG4 contains pentraxin (PTX)-like modules. ADGRG4 gene expression has been identified as a marker for neuroendocrine carcinoma cells.
