= ADGRG7 =

Protein-coding gene in the species Homo sapiens

Identifiers
- Aliases: ADGRG7, GPR128, adhesion G protein-coupled receptor G7
- External IDs: OMIM: 612307; MGI: 2441732; GeneCards: ADGRG7

Gene location (Human)
Chr.	Chromosome 3 (human)
Band	3q12.2	Start	100,609,601 bp
Band	3q12.2	End	100,695,479 bp

Gene location (Mouse)
Chr.	Chromosome 16 (mouse)
Band	16|16 C1.1	Start	56,544,972 bp
Band	16|16 C1.1	End	56,616,218 bp
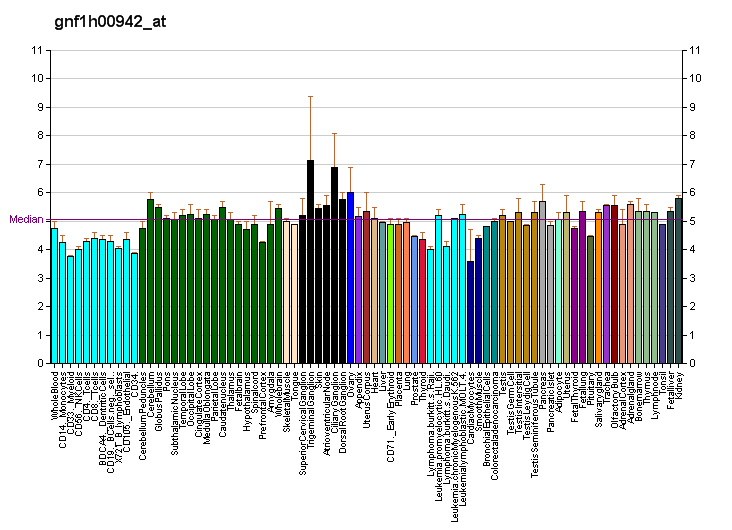
RNA expression pattern
Bgee	Human / Mouse (ortholog); Top expressed in: jejunal mucosa; duodenum; testicle; right lobe of liver; mucosa of transverse colon; gonad; rectum; gallbladder; smooth muscle tissue; appendix / Top expressed in: jejunum; ileum; colon; duodenum; spermatid; uterus; yolk sac; ovary; embryo; granulocyte; More reference expression data
BioGPS	More reference expression data
Gene ontology
Molecular function	G protein-coupled receptor activity; protein binding; transmembrane signaling receptor activity; signal transducer activity
Cellular component	integral component of membrane; membrane; intracellular anatomical structure; integral component of plasma membrane
Biological process	G protein-coupled receptor signaling pathway; cell surface receptor signaling pathway; signal transduction; adenylate cyclase-activating G protein-coupled receptor signaling pathway
Sources:Amigo / QuickGO
Orthologs
Databases	NCBI: entry; OMA: entry
Species	Human	Mouse
Entrez	84873	239853
Ensembl	ENSG00000144820	ENSMUSG00000022755
UniProt	Q96K78	Q8BM96
RefSeq (mRNA)	NM_001308362; NM_032787	NM_172825
RefSeq (protein)	NP_001295291; NP_116176	NP_766413
Location (UCSC)	Chr 3: 100.61 – 100.7 Mb	Chr 16: 56.54 – 56.62 Mb
PubMed search
- Wikidata
View/Edit Human	View/Edit Mouse

Adhesion G protein-coupled receptor G7 is a protein that in humans is encoded by the ADGRG7 gene (previously GPR128). ADGRG7 is a member of the adhesion GPCR family. Adhesion GPCRs are characterized by an extended extracellular region often possessing N-terminal protein modules that is linked to a TM7 region via a domain known as the GPCR-Autoproteolysis INducing (GAIN) domain.

== Tissue distribution ==
ADGRG7 is specifically expressed in human liver as well as in mouse bone marrow and intestinal tissues.

== Function ==
Ni et al. showed that Adgrg7 deletion in mice causes reduced body weight and induced intestinal contraction frequency.

== Clinical significance ==
A 111-kb copy number gain with breakpoints within the TRK-fused gene (a target of translocations in lymphoma and thyroid tumors) and ADGRG7 has been identified in the genome of patients with atypical myeloproliferative neoplasms. Notably, the fused gene was also detected in few healthy individuals.
