= ADGRA1 =

Protein-coding gene in the species Homo sapiens

Identifiers
- Aliases: ADGRA1, GPR123, adhesion G protein-coupled receptor A1
- External IDs: OMIM: 612302; MGI: 1277167; GeneCards: ADGRA1

Gene location (Human)
Chr.	Chromosome 10 (human)
Band	10q26.3	Start	133,087,924 bp
Band	10q26.3	End	133,131,675 bp

Gene location (Mouse)
Chr.	Chromosome 7 (mouse)
Band	7 F4|7 84.89 cM	Start	139,414,090 bp
Band	7 F4|7 84.89 cM	End	139,458,004 bp
RNA expression pattern
Bgee	Human / Mouse (ortholog); Top expressed in: right frontal lobe; Brodmann area 9; cingulate gyrus; anterior cingulate cortex; prefrontal cortex; hypothalamus; lateral nuclear group of thalamus; primary visual cortex; amygdala; ventricular zone / Top expressed in: facial motor nucleus; lumbar subsegment of spinal cord; medial dorsal nucleus; Rostral migratory stream; substantia nigra; lateral geniculate nucleus; medial geniculate nucleus; subiculum; dentate gyrus of hippocampal formation granule cell; amygdala; More reference expression data
BioGPS	n/a
Gene ontology
Molecular function	G protein-coupled receptor activity; transmembrane signaling receptor activity; signal transducer activity
Cellular component	integral component of membrane; membrane; postsynaptic density; glutamatergic synapse
Biological process	G protein-coupled receptor signaling pathway; cell surface receptor signaling pathway; signal transduction
Sources:Amigo / QuickGO
Orthologs
Databases	NCBI: entry; OMA: entry
Species	Human	Mouse
Entrez	84435	52389
Ensembl	ENSG00000197177	ENSMUSG00000025475
UniProt	Q86SQ6	Q8C4G9
RefSeq (mRNA)	NM_001083909; NM_001291085; NM_032422	NM_177469
RefSeq (protein)	NP_001077378; NP_001278014	NP_803420
Location (UCSC)	Chr 10: 133.09 – 133.13 Mb	Chr 7: 139.41 – 139.46 Mb
PubMed search
- Wikidata
View/Edit Human	View/Edit Mouse

Adhesion G protein-coupled receptor A1 is a protein that in humans is encoded by the ADGRA1 gene (previously GPR123). It is an orphan receptor which is a member of the adhesion-GPCR family of receptors. Family members are normally characterized by an extended extracellular region with a variable number of protein domains coupled to a TM7 domain via a domain known as the GPCR-Autoproteolysis INducing (GAIN) domain.
