= ADGRF1 =

Protein-coding gene in the species Homo sapiens

Identifiers
- Aliases: ADGRF1, KPG_012, PGR19, hGPCR36, GPR110, adhesion G protein-coupled receptor F1
- External IDs: OMIM: 617430; MGI: 1924846; GeneCards: ADGRF1

Gene location (Human)
Chr.	Chromosome 6 (human)
Band	6p12.3|6	Start	46,997,708 bp
Band	6p12.3|6	End	47,042,350 bp

Gene location (Mouse)
Chr.	Chromosome 17 (mouse)
Band	17|17 B3	Start	43,581,220 bp
Band	17|17 B3	End	43,635,628 bp
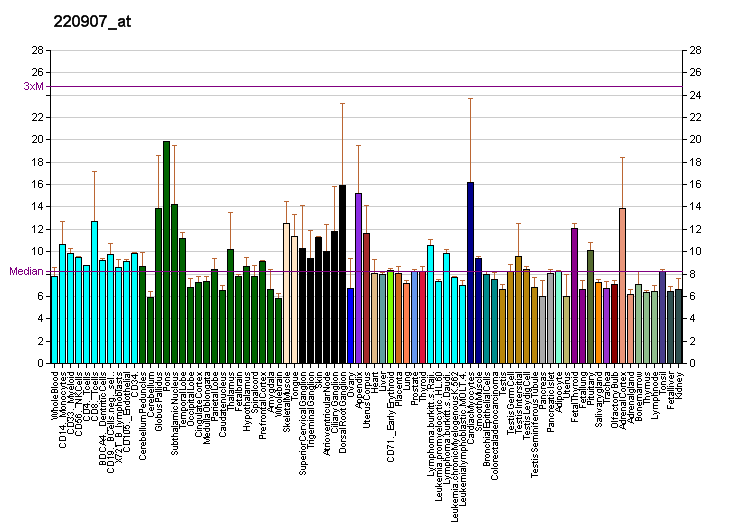
RNA expression pattern
Bgee	Human / Mouse (ortholog); Top expressed in: palpebral conjunctiva; amniotic fluid; epithelium of nasopharynx; olfactory zone of nasal mucosa; buccal mucosa cell; bronchial epithelial cell; renal medulla; right lobe of thyroid gland; gallbladder; oral cavity / Top expressed in: conjunctival fornix; cornea; right kidney; liver; duodenum; human kidney; colon; renal cortex; muscle of thigh; hypothalamus; More reference expression data
BioGPS	More reference expression data
Gene ontology
Molecular function	G protein-coupled receptor activity; transmembrane signaling receptor activity; signal transducer activity
Cellular component	integral component of membrane; extracellular region; plasma membrane; membrane; intracellular anatomical structure
Biological process	G protein-coupled receptor signaling pathway; cell surface receptor signaling pathway; signal transduction; synapse assembly; memory; neuron projection development; positive regulation of CREB transcription factor activity; adenylate cyclase-activating G protein-coupled receptor signaling pathway
Sources:Amigo / QuickGO
Orthologs
Databases	NCBI: entry; OMA: entry
Species	Human	Mouse
Entrez	266977	77596
Ensembl	ENSG00000153292	ENSMUSG00000041293
UniProt	Q5T601	Q8VEC3
RefSeq (mRNA)	NM_025048; NM_153840	NM_133776
RefSeq (protein)	NP_079324; NP_722582	NP_598537
Location (UCSC)	Chr 6: 47 – 47.04 Mb	Chr 17: 43.58 – 43.64 Mb
PubMed search
- Wikidata
View/Edit Human	View/Edit Mouse

Adhesion G protein-coupled receptor F1 is a protein that in humans is encoded by the ADGRF1 gene (previously GPR110). This protein acts as a receptor for synaptamide, an omega-3 fatty acid found significantly in the brain. It is a G protein-coupled receptor which couples to Gs alpha subunit G-proteins (and potentially others).

The ADGRF1 protein is a member of the adhesion-GPCR receptor family, which is a subfamily of G protein coupled receptors. Family members are characterized by an extended extracellular region with a variable number of N-terminal protein modules coupled to a TM7 region via a domain known as the GPCR-Autoproteolysis INducing (GAIN) domain.
