= ADGRG6 =

Protein-coding gene in the species Homo sapiens

Identifiers
- Aliases: ADGRG6, APG1, DREG, PS1TP2, VIGR, GPR126, LCCS9, adhesion G protein-coupled receptor G6, PR126
- External IDs: OMIM: 612243; MGI: 1916151; GeneCards: ADGRG6

Gene location (Human)
| Chr. | Chromosome 6 (human) |
| Band | 6q24.2 | Start | 142,301,854 bp |
| Band | 6q24.2 | End | 142,446,266 bp |

Gene location (Mouse)
| Chr. | Chromosome 10 (mouse) |
| Band | 10|10 A2 | Start | 14,278,327 bp |
| Band | 10|10 A2 | End | 14,421,403 bp |
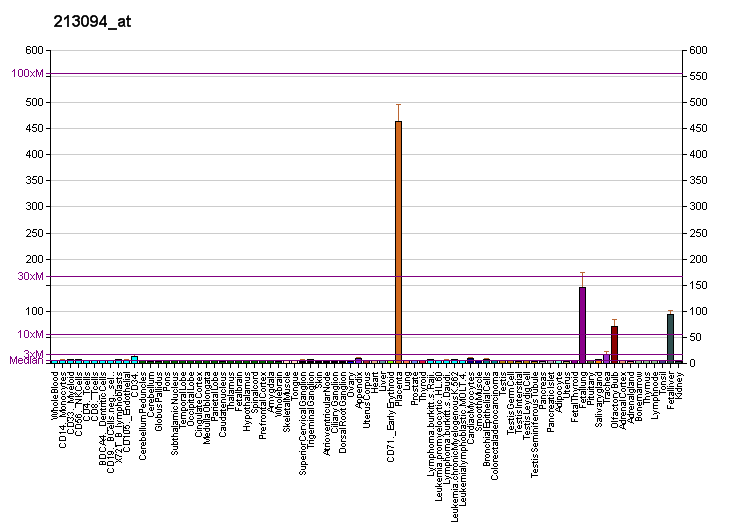
RNA expression pattern
| Bgee | Human / Mouse (ortholog); Top expressed in: amniotic fluid; placenta; liver; palpebral conjunctiva; jejunal mucosa; decidua; parietal pleura; right lobe of liver; epithelium of colon; duodenum / Top expressed in: otolith organ; utricle; vestibular sensory epithelium; left lung lobe; atrium; atrioventricular valve; trigeminal ganglion; parotid gland; stria vascularis; sciatic nerve; More reference expression data |
| BioGPS | More reference expression data |
Gene ontology
| Molecular function | collagen binding; signal transducer activity; extracellular matrix binding; transmembrane signaling receptor activity; G protein-coupled receptor activity; laminin binding |
| Cellular component | integral component of membrane; membrane; intracellular anatomical structure; plasma membrane; integral component of plasma membrane |
| Biological process | myelination; G protein-coupled receptor signaling pathway; cell surface receptor signaling pathway; signal transduction; mitochondrion organization; Schwann cell differentiation; cAMP-mediated signaling; myelination in peripheral nervous system; heart trabecula formation; adenylate cyclase-activating G protein-coupled receptor signaling pathway |
Sources:Amigo / QuickGO
Orthologs
| Databases | NCBI: entry; OMA: entry |
| Species | Human | Mouse |
| Entrez | 57211 | 215798 |
| Ensembl | ENSG00000112414 | ENSMUSG00000039116 |
| UniProt | Q86SQ4 | Q6F3F9 |
| RefSeq (mRNA) | NM_001032394; NM_001032395; NM_020455; NM_198569 | NM_001002268 |
| RefSeq (protein) | NP_001027566; NP_001027567; NP_065188; NP_940971 | NP_001002268 |
| Location (UCSC) | Chr 6: 142.3 – 142.45 Mb | Chr 10: 14.28 – 14.42 Mb |
| PubMed search |
- Wikidata
| View/Edit Human | View/Edit Mouse |

Adhesion G protein-coupled receptor G6, also known as GPR126, is a protein that in humans is encoded by the ADGRG6 gene. ADGRG6 is a member of the adhesion GPCR family. Adhesion GPCRs are characterized by an extended extracellular region often possessing N-terminal protein modules that is linked to a TM7 region via a domain known as the GPCR-Autoproteolysis INducing (GAIN) domain.

ADGRG6 is all widely expressed on stromal cells. The N-terminal fragment of ADGRG6 contains C1r-C1s, Uegf and Bmp1 (CUB), and PTX-like modules.

== Ligand ==
ADGRG6 was shown to bind collagen IV and laminin-211 promoting cyclic adenosine monophosphate (cAMP) to mediate myelination.

== Signaling ==
Upon lipopolysaccharide (LPS) or thrombin stimulation, expression of ADGRG6 is induced by MAP kinases in endothelial cells. During angiogenesis, ADGRG6 promotes protein kinase A (PKA)–cAMP-activated signaling in endothelial cells. Forced ADGRG6 expression in COS-7 cells enhances cAMP levels by coupling to heterotrimeric Gα_{s/i} proteins.

== Function ==
ADGRG6 has been identified in genomic regions associated with adult height, more specially trunk height, pulmonary function and adolescent idiopathic scoliosis. In the vertebrate nervous system, many axons are surrounded by a myelin sheath to conduct action potentials rapidly and efficiently. Applying a genetic screen in zebrafish mutants, Talbot's group demonstrated that ADGRG6 affects the development of myelinated axons. ADGRG6 drives the differentiation of Schwann cells through inducing cAMP levels, which causes Oct6 transcriptional activities to promote myelin gene activity. Mutation of Adgrg6 in zebrafish affects peripheral myelination. Monk's group demonstrated domain-specific functions of ADGRG6 during Schwann cells development: the NTF is necessary and sufficient for axon sorting, while the CTF promotes wrapping through cAMP induction to regulate early and late stages of Schwann cells development.

Outside of neurons, ADGRG6 function is required for heart and inner ear development. ADGRG6 stimulates VEGF signaling and angiogenesis by modulating VEGF receptor 2 (VEGFR2) expression through STAT5 and GATA2 in endothelial cells.

== Disease ==
Mouse models have shown ADGRG6 deletion to affect cartilage biology and spinal column development, supporting findings that variants of ADGRG6 have been associated with adolescent idiopathic scoliosis, and Mutations have been shown to be responsible for severe arthrogryposis multiplex congenita
