= ADGRG2 =

Protein-coding gene in humans

Identifiers
- Aliases: ADGRG2, EDDM6, HE6, TM7LN2, GPR64, adhesion G protein-coupled receptor G2, CBAVDX
- External IDs: OMIM: 300572; MGI: 2446854; GeneCards: ADGRG2

Gene location (Human)
| Chr. | X chromosome (human) |
| Band | Xp22.13 | Start | 18,989,307 bp |
| Band | Xp22.13 | End | 19,122,637 bp |

Gene location (Mouse)
| Chr. | X chromosome (mouse) |
| Band | X|X F4 | Start | 159,173,686 bp |
| Band | X|X F4 | End | 159,281,066 bp |
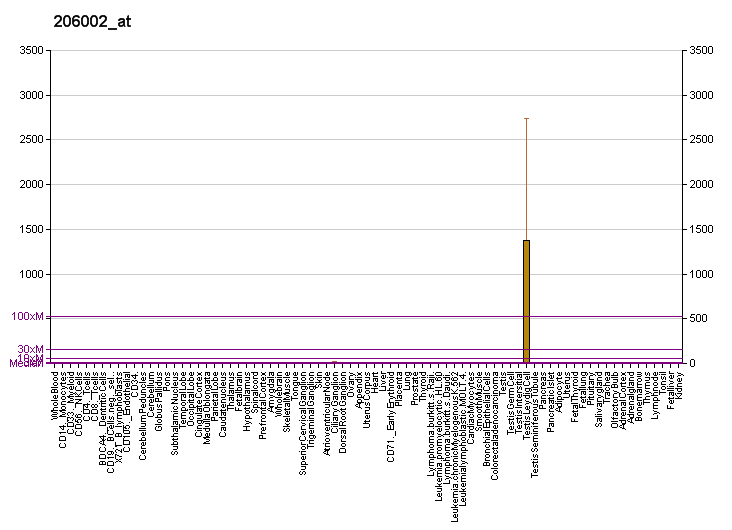
RNA expression pattern
| Bgee | Human / Mouse (ortholog); Top expressed in: corpus epididymis; caput epididymis; parotid gland; tail of epididymis; synovial joint; cartilage tissue; synovial membrane; spinal ganglia; pancreatic ductal cell; islet of Langerhans / Top expressed in: efferent ductule; trigeminal ganglion; lumbar spinal ganglion; epithelium of stomach; endothelial cell of lymphatic vessel; epididymis; vas deferens; otolith organ; utricle; stroma of bone marrow; More reference expression data |
| BioGPS | More reference expression data |
Gene ontology
| Molecular function | G protein-coupled receptor activity; signal transducer activity; transmembrane signaling receptor activity |
| Cellular component | integral component of membrane; cell surface; integral component of plasma membrane; extracellular exosome; apical plasma membrane; membrane; cytosol; plasma membrane |
| Biological process | G protein-coupled receptor signaling pathway; cell surface receptor signaling pathway; spermatogenesis; signal transduction; adenylate cyclase-activating G protein-coupled receptor signaling pathway |
Sources:Amigo / QuickGO
Orthologs
| Databases | NCBI: entry; OMA: entry |
| Species | Human | Mouse |
| Entrez | 10149 | 237175 |
| Ensembl | ENSG00000173698 | ENSMUSG00000031298 |
| UniProt | Q8IZP9 | Q8CJ12 |
| RefSeq (mRNA) | NM_001079858; NM_001079859; NM_001079860; NM_001184833; NM_001184834 NM_001184835; NM_001184836; NM_001184837; NM_005756 | NM_001079847; NM_001079848; NM_001079857; NM_001290445; NM_001290446 NM_178712 |
| RefSeq (protein) | NP_001073327; NP_001073328; NP_001073329; NP_001171762; NP_001171763 NP_001171764; NP_001171765; NP_001171766; NP_005747 | NP_001073316; NP_001073317; NP_001073326; NP_001277374; NP_001277375 NP_848827 |
| Location (UCSC) | Chr X: 18.99 – 19.12 Mb | Chr X: 159.17 – 159.28 Mb |
| PubMed search |
- Wikidata
| View/Edit Human | View/Edit Mouse |

Adhesion G protein-coupled receptor G2 also known as GPR64 is a protein encoded by the ADGRG2 gene. GPR64 is a member of the adhesion GPCR family. Adhesion GPCRs are characterized by an extended extracellular region often possessing N-terminal protein modules that is linked to a TM7 region via a domain known as the GPCR-Autoproteolysis INducing (GAIN) domain.

The adhesion GPCR, GPR64, is an orphan receptor characterized by a long N-terminus with that has been suggested to be highly glycosylated. GPR64's N-terminus has been reported to be cleaved at the GPS domain to allow for trafficking to the plasma membrane. After cleavage the N-terminus is believed to remain non-covalently associated with the 7TM. GPR64 expression has been mostly reported in the male reproductive organs, but more recently has been shown to be expressed in the parathyroid glands and central nervous system. GPR64 is mainly expressed in human and mouse epididymis as well as human prostate and parathyroid. GPR64, together with F-actin scaffold, locates at the nonciliated principal cells of the proximal male excurrent duct epithelia, where reabsorption of testicular fluid and concentration of sperm takes place.

== Function ==
Targeting of Gpr64 in mice causes reduced fertility or infertility in males; but the reproductive capacity was unaffected in females. Unchanged hormone expression in knockout males indicates that the receptor functions immediately in the male genital tract. Lack of Gpr64 expression causes sperm stasis and duct obstruction due to abnormal fluid reabsorption. In addition, expression of GPR64 has been found in fibroblast-like synovial cells obtained from osteoarthritis but not from rheumatoid arthritis.

== Clinical significance ==
GPR64 is significantly overexpressed in the Wnt signaling-dependent subgroup of medulloblastoma, as well as in ewing sarcomas and carcinomas derived from prostate, kidney or lung. Richter et al. demonstrated that GPR64 promotes tumor invasion and metastasis through placental growth factor and MMP1. Upregulation and activation of GPR64 are associated with primary hyperparathyroidism and hypersecretion of parathyroid hormone.
