= Latrophilin 3 =

Protein-coding gene in the species Homo sapiens

ADGRL3

Identifiers
- Aliases: ADGRL3, CIRL3, LEC3, CL3, LPHN3, adhesion G protein-coupled receptor L3
- External IDs: OMIM: 616417; MGI: 2441950; GeneCards: ADGRL3
Available structures
PDB	Ortholog search: PDBe RCSB
PDB	List of PDB id codes 5CMN, 5AFB

Gene location (Human)
Chr.	Chromosome 4 (human)
Band	4q13.1	Start	61,201,258 bp
Band	4q13.1	End	62,078,335 bp

Gene location (Mouse)
Chr.	Chromosome 5 (mouse)
Band	5|5 D-E1	Start	81,020,138 bp
Band	5|5 D-E1	End	81,825,133 bp
RNA expression pattern
Bgee	Human / Mouse (ortholog); Top expressed in: hair follicle; saphenous vein; middle temporal gyrus; endothelial cell; entorhinal cortex; pars compacta; superior vestibular nucleus; orbitofrontal cortex; Achilles tendon; Brodmann area 23 / Top expressed in: Region I of hippocampus proper; otolith organ; utricle; ventromedial nucleus; substantia nigra; anterior amygdaloid area; lateral septal nucleus; lateral hypothalamus; medial geniculate nucleus; olfactory tubercle; More reference expression data
BioGPS	n/a
Gene ontology
Molecular function	G protein-coupled receptor activity; signal transducer activity; metal ion binding; protein binding; transmembrane signaling receptor activity; carbohydrate binding; calcium ion binding
Cellular component	integral component of membrane; cell projection; membrane; cell-cell junction; plasma membrane; axon; cell junction; integral component of plasma membrane; glutamatergic synapse; intracellular anatomical structure
Biological process	response to cocaine; G protein-coupled receptor signaling pathway; neuron migration; cell surface receptor signaling pathway; synapse assembly; locomotion involved in locomotory behavior; signal transduction; positive regulation of synapse assembly; cell-cell adhesion via plasma-membrane adhesion molecules; synapse organization; adenylate cyclase-activating G protein-coupled receptor signaling pathway; brain development
Sources:Amigo / QuickGO
Orthologs
Databases	NCBI: entry; OMA: entry
Species	Human	Mouse
Entrez	23284	319387
Ensembl	ENSG00000150471	ENSMUSG00000037605
UniProt	Q9HAR2	Q80TS3
RefSeq (mRNA)	NM_015236; NM_001322246; NM_001322402; NM_001371342; NM_001371343 NM_001371344; NM_001371345; NM_001371346	NM_198702; NM_001347367; NM_001347368; NM_001347369; NM_001347371 NM_001359826; NM_001359828; NM_001359829; NM_001359830; NM_001359831; NM_001359832; NM_001359833; NM_001359834
RefSeq (protein)	NP_001309175; NP_001309331; NP_056051; NP_001358271; NP_001358272 NP_001358273; NP_001358274; NP_001358275	NP_001334296; NP_001334297; NP_001334298; NP_001334300; NP_941991 NP_001346755; NP_001346757; NP_001346758; NP_001346759; NP_001346760; NP_001346761; NP_001346762; NP_001346763
Location (UCSC)	Chr 4: 61.2 – 62.08 Mb	Chr 5: 81.02 – 81.83 Mb
PubMed search
- Wikidata
View/Edit Human	View/Edit Mouse

Latrophilin 3 is a protein that in humans is encoded by the ADGRL3 gene.

== Function ==
This gene encodes a member of the latrophilin subfamily of G protein-coupled receptors (GPCR). Latrophilins may function in both cell adhesion and signal transduction. In experiments with non-human species, endogenous proteolytic cleavage within a cysteine-rich GPS (G-protein-coupled-receptor proteolysis site) domain resulted in two subunits (a large extracellular N-terminal cell adhesion subunit and a subunit with substantial similarity to the secretin/calcitonin family of GPCRs) being non-covalently bound at the cell membrane.

== Clinical significance ==
A version of this gene has been linked to attention deficit hyperactivity disorder (ADHD).

== See also ==
- Adhesion G protein-coupled receptors
