= ADGRG3 =

Protein-coding gene in the species Homo sapiens

Identifiers
- Aliases: ADGRG3, PB99, PGR26, GPR97, adhesion G protein-coupled receptor G3
- External IDs: OMIM: 618441; MGI: 1859670; GeneCards: ADGRG3

Gene location (Mouse)
Chr.	Chromosome 8 (mouse)
Band	8|8 C5	Start	95,744,320 bp
Band	8|8 C5	End	95,771,878 bp
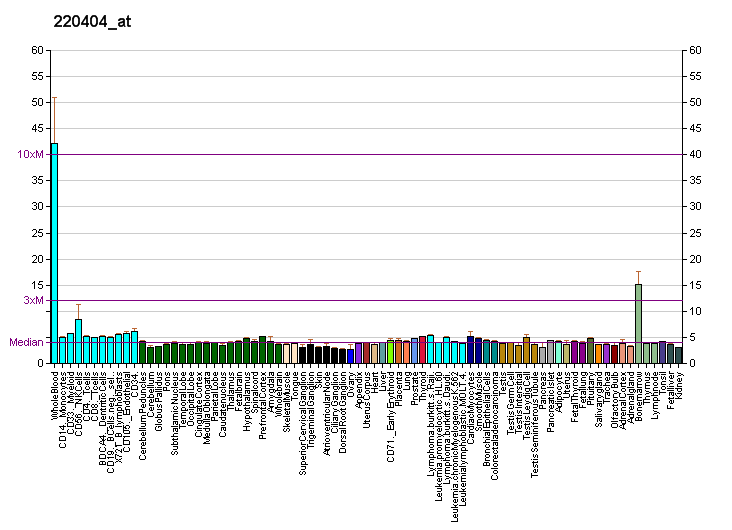
RNA expression pattern
Bgee	Human / Mouse (ortholog); Top expressed in: blood; spleen; bone marrow; right lung; bone marrow cell; upper lobe of left lung; left uterine tube; periodontal fiber; appendix; trabecular bone / Top expressed in: granulocyte; endothelial cell of lymphatic vessel; tibiofemoral joint; bone marrow; gastrula; decidua; embryo; yolk sac; medullary collecting duct; carotid body; More reference expression data
BioGPS	More reference expression data
Gene ontology
Molecular function	G protein-coupled receptor activity; transmembrane signaling receptor activity; signal transducer activity
Cellular component	integral component of membrane; membrane; plasma membrane; specific granule membrane; integral component of plasma membrane
Biological process	negative regulation of NIK/NF-kappaB signaling; G protein-coupled receptor signaling pathway; B cell differentiation; cell surface receptor signaling pathway; negative regulation of CREB transcription factor activity; regulation of cell migration; signal transduction; neutrophil degranulation; adenylate cyclase-activating G protein-coupled receptor signaling pathway
Sources:Amigo / QuickGO
Orthologs
Databases	NCBI: entry
Species	Human	Mouse
Entrez	222487	54672
Ensembl	n/a	ENSMUSG00000060470
UniProt	Q86Y34	Q8R0T6
RefSeq (mRNA)	NM_001308360; NM_170776	NM_173036; NM_025309
RefSeq (protein)	NP_001295289; NP_740746	NP_766624
Location (UCSC)	n/a	Chr 8: 95.74 – 95.77 Mb
PubMed search
- Wikidata
View/Edit Human	View/Edit Mouse

Adhesion G protein-coupled receptor G3 (ADGRG3) is a protein that in humans is encoded by the ADGRG3 gene (previously GPR97). ADGRG3 is a member of the adhesion GPCR family. Adhesion GPCRs are characterized by an extended extracellular region often possessing N-terminal protein modules that is linked to a TM7 region via a domain known as the GPCR-Autoproteolysis INducing (GAIN) domain.

ADGRG3 is expressed in human granulocytes and endothelial cells of the vasculature as well as in mouse granulocytes, monocytes, macrophages, and dendritic cells.

== Signaling ==
The inositol phosphate (IP3) accumulation, aequorin, and ^{35}S isotope binding assays in overexpressing HEK293 cells have demonstrated coupling of ADGRG3 to Gα_{o} protein triggering cyclic adenosine monophosphate (cAMP). GPR97 actives cAMP response element-binding protein (CREB), NF-κB, and small GTPases to regulate cellular functions.

== Function ==
Systemic steroid exposure is a therapy to treat a variety of medical conditions and is associated with epigenetic processes such as DNA methylation that may reflect pharmacological responses and/or side effects. ADGRG3 was found to be differently methylated at CpG sites in the genome of blood cells from patient under systemic steroid treatment. ADGRG3 is transcribed in immune cells. Gene-deficient mice revealed that Adgrg3 is crucial for maintaining B-cell population via constitutive CREB and NF-κB activities. Human lymphatic endothelial cells (LECs) abundantly express ADGRG3. Silencing ADGRG3 in human LECs indicated that ADGRG3 modulates cytoskeletal rearrangement, cell adhesion and migration through regulating the small GTPase RhoA and cdc42. In vertebrates, ADGRG3 has an indispensable role in the bone morphogenetic proteins (BMP) signaling pathway in bone formation. A microarray meta-analysis revealed that mouse ADGRG3 is a direct transcriptional target of BMP signaling in long bone development.
