= EGF module-containing mucin-like hormone receptor =

G protein-coupled receptor

egf-like module containing, mucin-like, hormone receptor-like 1

Identifiers
- Symbol: EMR1
- Alt. symbols: TM7LN3
- IUPHAR: 182
- NCBI gene: 2015
- HGNC: 3336
- OMIM: 600493
- RefSeq: NM_001974
- UniProt: Q14246

Other data
- Locus: Chr. 19 p13.3
Search for
- Structures: Swiss-model
- Domains: InterPro

egf-like module containing, mucin-like, hormone receptor-like 2

Identifiers
- Symbol: EMR2
- IUPHAR: 183
- NCBI gene: 30817
- HGNC: 3337
- OMIM: 606100
- RefSeq: NM_152916
- UniProt: Q9UHX3

Other data
- Locus: Chr. 19 p13.1
Search for
- Structures: Swiss-model
- Domains: InterPro

egf-like module containing, mucin-like, hormone receptor-like 3

Identifiers
- Symbol: EMR3
- IUPHAR: 184
- NCBI gene: 84658
- HGNC: 23647
- OMIM: 606101
- RefSeq: NM_032571
- UniProt: Q9BY15

Other data
- Locus: Chr. 19 p13.1
Search for
- Structures: Swiss-model
- Domains: InterPro

egf-like module containing, mucin-like, hormone receptor-like 4 pseudogene

Identifiers
- Symbol: EMR4P
- Alt. symbols: GPR127
- NCBI gene: 326342
- HGNC: 19240
- RefSeq: XM_940358
- UniProt: Q86SQ3

Other data
- Locus: Chr. 19 p13.3
Search for
- Structures: Swiss-model
- Domains: InterPro

The EGF module-containing Mucin-like hormone Receptors (EMRs) are closely related subgroup of G protein-coupled receptors (GPCRs). These receptors have a unique hybrid structure in which an extracellular epidermal growth factor (EGF)-like domain is fused to a GPCR domain through a mucin-like stalk. There are four variants of EMR labeled 1–4, each encoded by a separate gene. These receptors are predominantly expressed in cells of the immune system and bind ligands such as CD55.
