= ADGRA3 =

Protein-coding gene in the species Homo sapiens

Identifiers
- Aliases: ADGRA3, PGR21, TEM5L, GPR125, adhesion G protein-coupled receptor A3
- External IDs: OMIM: 612303; MGI: 1917943; GeneCards: ADGRA3

Gene location (Mouse)
Chr.	Chromosome 5 (mouse)
Band	5|5 B3	Start	50,117,298 bp
Band	5|5 B3	End	50,216,348 bp
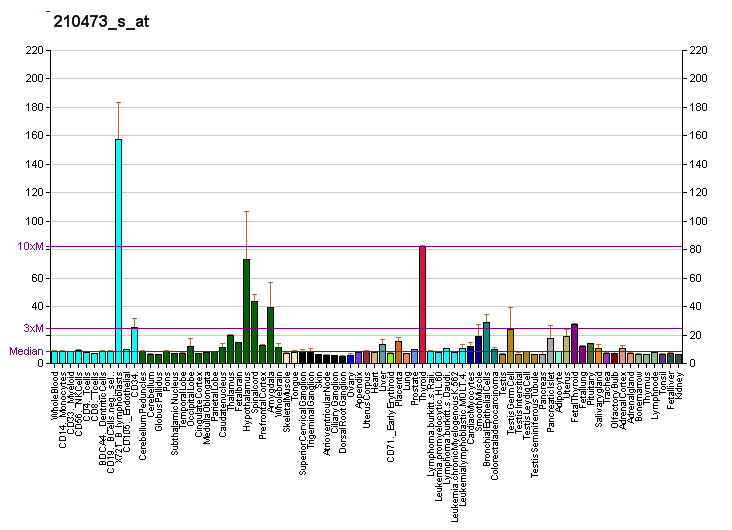
RNA expression pattern
Bgee	Human / Mouse (ortholog); Top expressed in: ganglionic eminence; right lobe of liver; right uterine tube; stromal cell of endometrium; synovial joint; Achilles tendon; rectum; transverse colon; hair follicle; secondary oocyte / Top expressed in: Gonadal ridge; mandibular prominence; maxillary prominence; hair follicle; tail of embryo; facial skeleton; molar; vestibular sensory epithelium; Dermatocranium; somite; More reference expression data
BioGPS	More reference expression data
Gene ontology
Molecular function	G protein-coupled receptor activity; protein binding; transmembrane signaling receptor activity; signal transducer activity
Cellular component	integral component of membrane; membrane; external side of plasma membrane
Biological process	G protein-coupled receptor signaling pathway; cell surface receptor signaling pathway; signal transduction
Sources:Amigo / QuickGO
Orthologs
Databases	NCBI: entry
Species	Human	Mouse
Entrez	166647	70693
Ensembl	n/a	ENSMUSG00000029090
UniProt	Q8IWK6	Q7TT36
RefSeq (mRNA)	NM_145290	NM_133911
RefSeq (protein)	NP_660333	NP_598672
Location (UCSC)	n/a	Chr 5: 50.12 – 50.22 Mb
PubMed search
- Wikidata
View/Edit Human	View/Edit Mouse

Adhesion G-protein coupled receptor A3 or (ADGRA3) is a protein that in humans is encoded by the ADGRA3 gene (previously GPR125) It is an orphan receptor from the adhesion G protein-coupled receptor family. It is missing a particular catalytic triad sequence in its GPS region, and so it is thought to not undergo autocatalytic cleavage in that region, unlike most members of its family.
