= CD97 =

Mammalian protein found in humans

ADGRE5
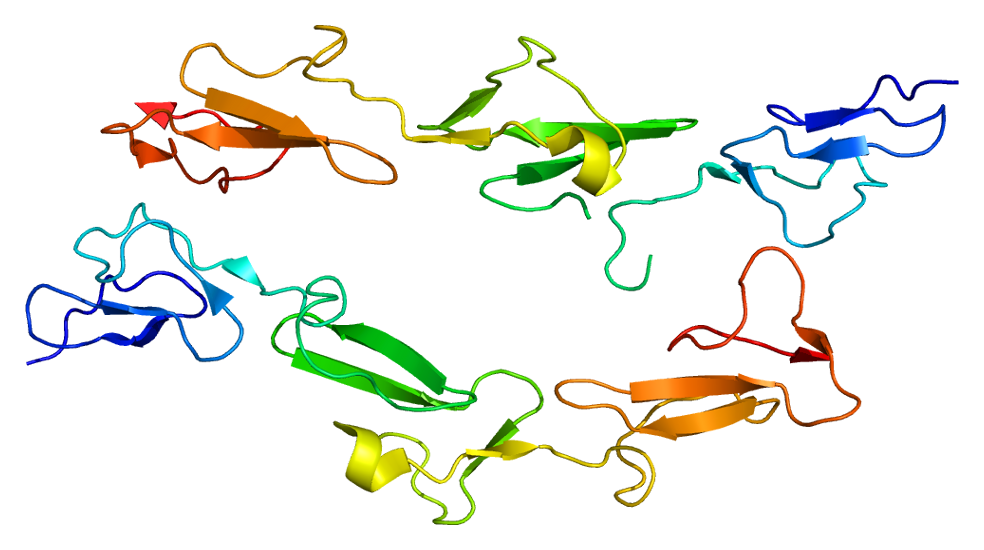

Identifiers
- Aliases: ADGRE5, TM7LN1, CD97, adhesion G protein-coupled receptor E5
- External IDs: OMIM: 601211; MGI: 1347095; GeneCards: ADGRE5

Gene location (Human)
Chr.	Chromosome 19 (human)
Band	19p13.12	Start	14,380,501 bp
Band	19p13.12	End	14,408,725 bp

Gene location (Mouse)
Chr.	Chromosome 8 (mouse)
Band	8 C2|8 40.22 cM	Start	84,449,880 bp
Band	8 C2|8 40.22 cM	End	84,467,955 bp
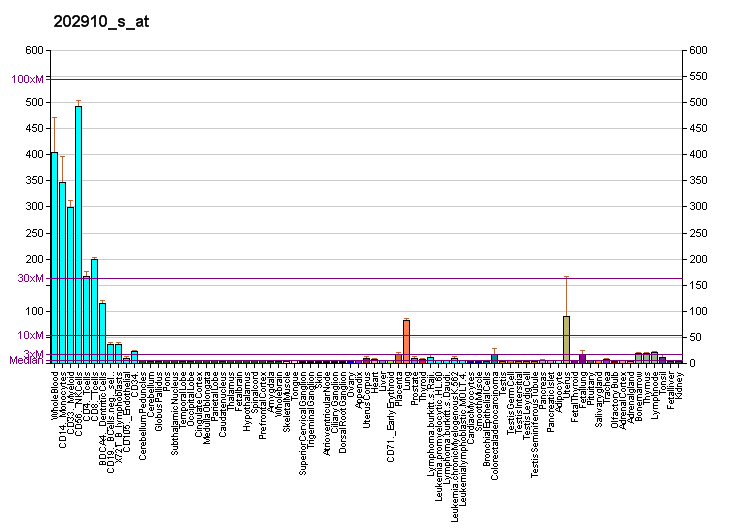
RNA expression pattern
Bgee	Human / Mouse (ortholog); Top expressed in: granulocyte; monocyte; ascending aorta; blood; Descending thoracic aorta; body of uterus; spleen; right coronary artery; upper lobe of left lung; stromal cell of endometrium / Top expressed in: granulocyte; thymus; urinary bladder; esophagus; proximal tubule; lung; jejunum; smooth muscle tissue; spleen; muscle of thigh; More reference expression data
BioGPS	More reference expression data
Gene ontology
Molecular function	calcium ion binding; G protein-coupled receptor activity; protein binding; transmembrane signaling receptor activity; signal transducer activity
Cellular component	integral component of membrane; extracellular region; plasma membrane; integral component of plasma membrane; extracellular exosome; membrane; focal adhesion; extracellular space; secretory granule membrane
Biological process	cell-cell signaling; G protein-coupled receptor signaling pathway; cell surface receptor signaling pathway; cell adhesion; inflammatory response; immune response; signal transduction; neutrophil degranulation; adenylate cyclase-activating G protein-coupled receptor signaling pathway
Sources:Amigo / QuickGO
Orthologs
Databases	NCBI: entry; OMA: entry
Species	Human	Mouse
Entrez	976	26364
Ensembl	ENSG00000123146	ENSMUSG00000002885
UniProt	P48960	Q9Z0M6
RefSeq (mRNA)	NM_001025160; NM_001784; NM_078481	NM_001163029; NM_001163030; NM_001163031; NM_011925
RefSeq (protein)	NP_001020331; NP_001775; NP_510966	NP_001156501; NP_001156502; NP_001156503; NP_036055
Location (UCSC)	Chr 19: 14.38 – 14.41 Mb	Chr 8: 84.45 – 84.47 Mb
PubMed search
- Wikidata
View/Edit Human	View/Edit Mouse

Cluster of differentiation 97 is a protein also known as BL-Ac[F2] encoded by the ADGRE5 gene. CD97 is a member of the adhesion G protein-coupled receptor (GPCR) family. Adhesion GPCRs are characterized by an extended extracellular region often possessing N-terminal protein modules that is linked to a TM7 region via a domain known as the GPCR-Autoproteolysis INducing (GAIN) domain.

CD97 is widely expressed on, among others, hematopoietic stem and progenitor cells, immune cells, epithelial cells, muscle cells as well as their malignant counterparts. In the case of CD97 the N-terminal domains consist of alternatively spliced epidermal growth factor (EGF)-like domains. Alternative splicing has been observed for this gene and three variants have been found. The N-terminal fragment of CD97 contains 3-5 EGF-like domains in human and 3-4 EGF-like domains in mice.

== Ligands ==
Decay accelerating factor (DAF/CD55), a regulatory protein of the complement cascade, interacts with the first and second EGF-like domains of CD97; chondroitin sulfate B with the fourth EGF-like domain; α5β1 and αvβ3 integrins with an RGD downstream the EGF-like domains; and CD90 (Thy-1) with the GAIN domain. N-glycosylation of CD97 within the EGF domains is crucial for CD55 binding.

== Signaling ==
Transgenic expression of a CD97 in mice enhanced levels of nonphosphorylated membrane-bound β-catenin and phosphorylated Akt. Furthermore, ectopic CD97 expression facilitated RhoA activation through binding of Gα12/13 as well as induced Ki67 expression and phosphorylated ERK and Akt through enhancing lysophosphatidic acid receptor 1 (LPAR1) signaling. Lysophosphatidylethanolamine (LPE; a plasma membrane component) and lysophosphatidic acid (LPA) use heterodimeric LPAR1–CD97 to drive G_{i/o} protein–phospholipase C–inositol 1,4,5-trisphosphate signaling and induce [Ca2+] in breast cancer cells.

== Function ==
In the immune system, CD97 is known as a critical mediator of host defense. Upon lymphoid, myeloid cells and neutrophil activation, CD97 is upregulated to promote adhesion and migration to sites of inflammation. Moreover, it has been shown that CD97 regulates granulocyte homeostasis. Mice lacking CD97 or its ligand CD55 have twice as many granulocytes as wild-type mice possibly due to enhanced granulopoiesis. Antibodies against CD97 have been demonstrated to diminish various inflammatory disorders by depleting granulocytes. Notably, CD97 antibody-mediated granulocytopenia only happens under the condition of pro-inflammation via an Fc receptor-associated mechanism. Finally, the interaction between CD97 and its ligand CD55 regulates T-cell activation and increases proliferation and cytokine production.

Changes in the expression of CD97 have been described for auto-inflammatory diseases, such as rheumatoid arthritis and multiple sclerosis. The expression of CD97 on macrophage and the abundant presence of its ligand CD55 on fibroblast-like synovial cells suggest that the CD97-CD55 interaction is involved in the recruitment and/or retention of macrophages into the synovial tissue in rheumatoid arthritis. CD97 antibodies and lack of CD97 or CD55 in mice reduced synovial inflammation and joint damage in collagen- and K/BxN serum transfer-induced arthritis. In brain tissue, CD97 is undetectable in normal white matter, and expression of CD55 is fairly restricted to the endothelium. In pre-active lesion, increased expression of CD55 in endothelial cells and robust CD97 expression on infiltrating leukocytes suggest a possible role of both molecules in immune cell migration through the blood-brain barrier. Additionally, soluble N-terminal fragment (NTF)s of CD97 are detectable in the serum of patients with rheumatoid arthritis and multiple sclerosis.

Outside the immune system, CD97 is likely involved in cell–cell interactions. CD97 in colonic enterocytes strengthens E-cadherin-based adherens junctions to maintain lateral cell-cell contacts and regulates the localization and degradation of β-catenin through glycogen synthase kinase-3β (GSK-3β) and Akt signaling. Ectopic CD97 expression upregulates the expression of N-cadherin and β-catenin in HT1080 fibrosarcoma cells leading to enhanced cell-cell aggregation. CD97 is expressed at the sarcoplasmic reticulum and the peripheral sarcolemma in skeletal muscle. However, lack of CD97 only affects the structure of the sarcoplasmic reticulum, but not the function of skeletal muscle. In addition, CD97 promotes angiogenesis of the endothelium through to α5β1 and αvβ3 integrins, which contributes to cell attachment.

== Clinical significance ==
CD97 expression in cancer was first reported for dedifferentiated thyroid carcinoma and their lymph node metastases. CD97 is expressed on many types of tumors including thyroid, gastric, pancreatic, esophageal, colorectal, and oral squamous carcinomas as well as glioblastoma and glioblastoma-initiating cells. In addition, enhanced CD97 expression has been found at the invasion front of tumors, suggesting a possible role in tumor migration/invasion, and correlated with a poorer clinical prognosis. CD97 has isoform-specific functions in some tumors. For instance, the small EGF(1,2,5) isoform promoted tumor invasion and metastasis in gastric carcinoma; the small EGF(1,2,5) isoform induced but the full length EGF(1-5) isoform suppressed gastric carcinoma invasion.

Forced CD97 expression induced cell migration, activated proteolytic matrix metalloproteinases (MMPs), and enhanced secretion of the chemokines interleukin (IL)-8. Tumor suppressor microRNA-126, often downregulated in cancer, was found to target CD97 thereby modulating cancer progression. CD97 can heterodimerize with the LPAR1, a canonical GPCR that is implied in tumor progression, to modulate synergistic functions and LPA-mediated Rho signaling. It has been shown that CD97 regulates localization and degradation of β-catenin. GSK-3β, inhibited in some cancer, regulates the stability of β-catenin in cytoplasm and subsequently, cytosolic β-catenin moves into the nucleus to facilitate expression of pro-oncogenic genes. Because of its role in tumor invasion and angiogenesis, CD97 is a potential therapeutic target. Several treatments reduce CD97 expression in tumor cells such as cytokine tumor growth factor (TGF)β as well as the compounds sodium butyrate, retinoic acid, and troglitazone. Taken together, experimental evidence indicates that CD97 plays multiple roles in tumor progress.
