= Glucagon receptor family =

InterPro Family

The glucagon receptor family is a group of closely related G-protein coupled receptors which include:

- Glucagon receptor
- Glucagon-like peptide 1 receptor
- Glucagon-like peptide 2 receptor
- Gastric inhibitory polypeptide receptor

The first three receptors bind closely related peptide hormones (glucagon, glucagon-like peptide-1, glucagon-like peptide-2) derived from the proglucagon polypeptide. The last receptor binds gastric inhibitory polypeptide.
