= EMR1 =

Protein-coding gene in the species Homo sapiens

ADGRE1

Identifiers
- Aliases: ADGRE1, TM7LN3, EMR1, adhesion G protein-coupled receptor E1
- External IDs: OMIM: 600493; MGI: 106912; GeneCards: ADGRE1

Gene location (Human)
Chr.	Chromosome 19 (human)
Band	19p13.3-p13.2	Start	6,887,566 bp
Band	19p13.3-p13.2	End	6,940,459 bp

Gene location (Mouse)
Chr.	Chromosome 17 (mouse)
Band	17 D|17 29.8 cM	Start	57,665,691 bp
Band	17 D|17 29.8 cM	End	57,790,527 bp
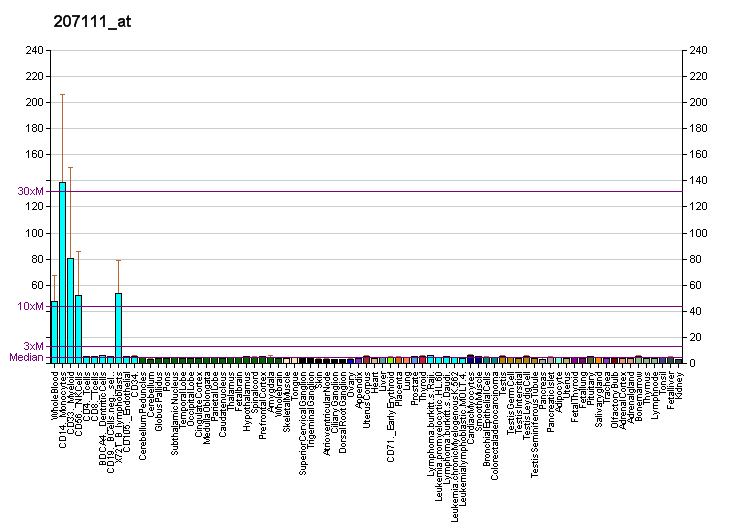
RNA expression pattern
Bgee	Human / Mouse (ortholog); Top expressed in: monocyte; blood; granulocyte; testicle; spleen; bone marrow; appendix; right lung; bone marrow cell; palpebral conjunctiva / Top expressed in: stroma of bone marrow; muscle layer of urethra; calvaria; granulocyte; mesenteric lymph nodes; lamina propria of urethra; spleen; right ventricle; tibiofemoral joint; ankle joint; More reference expression data
BioGPS	More reference expression data
Gene ontology
Molecular function	calcium ion binding; G protein-coupled receptor activity; transmembrane signaling receptor activity; signal transducer activity
Cellular component	integral component of membrane; plasma membrane; integral component of plasma membrane; membrane; external side of plasma membrane; cell periphery; intracellular anatomical structure
Biological process	G protein-coupled receptor signaling pathway; cell surface receptor signaling pathway; cell adhesion; adaptive immune response; signal transduction; immune system process; adenylate cyclase-activating G protein-coupled receptor signaling pathway
Sources:Amigo / QuickGO
Orthologs
Databases	NCBI: entry; OMA: entry
Species	Human	Mouse
Entrez	2015	13733
Ensembl	ENSG00000174837	ENSMUSG00000004730
UniProt	Q14246	Q61549
RefSeq (mRNA)	NM_001256252; NM_001256253; NM_001256254; NM_001256255; NM_001974	NM_010130; NM_001355722; NM_001355723
RefSeq (protein)	NP_001243181; NP_001243182; NP_001243183; NP_001243184; NP_001965	NP_034260; NP_001342651; NP_001342652
Location (UCSC)	Chr 19: 6.89 – 6.94 Mb	Chr 17: 57.67 – 57.79 Mb
PubMed search
- Wikidata
View/Edit Human	View/Edit Mouse

EGF-like module-containing mucin-like hormone receptor-like 1 also known as F4/80 is a protein encoded by the ADGRE1 gene.

EMR1 is a member of the adhesion GPCR family characterized by an extended extracellular region containing EGF-like domains. EMR1 is predominantly expressed on the surface of macrophages and plays a significant role in immune response modulation and inflammation. Its expression has been linked to various inflammatory diseases.

== Structure ==
Adhesion GPCRs are characterized by an extended extracellular region often possessing N-terminal protein modules that is linked to a TM7 region via a domain known as the GPCR-Autoproteolysis INducing (GAIN) domain.

The N-terminal fragment (NTF) of EMR1 contains 4-6 Epidermal Growth Factor-like (EGF-like) domains in human and 4-7 EGF-like domains in the mouse.

== Tissue distribution ==
EMR1 expression in human is restricted to eosinophils and is a specific marker for these cells. The murine homolog of EMR1, F4/80, is a well-known and widely used marker of murine macrophage populations.

== Function ==
F4/80 is not necessary for the development of tissue macrophages but is required for the induction of efferent CD8^{+} regulatory T cells needed for peripheral tolerance.

== Clinical significance ==
EMR1 can serve as a therapeutic target for depletion of these cells in eosinophilic disorders by using afucosylated antibodies.

== See also ==
- EGF module-containing mucin-like hormone receptor
