= ADGRF4 =

Protein-coding gene in the species Homo sapiens

Identifiers
- Aliases: ADGRF4, PGR18, GPR115, adhesion G protein-coupled receptor F4
- External IDs: OMIM: 614268; MGI: 1925499; GeneCards: ADGRF4

Gene location (Human)
Chr.	Chromosome 6 (human)
Band	6p12.3	Start	47,685,864 bp
Band	6p12.3	End	47,722,021 bp

Gene location (Mouse)
Chr.	Chromosome 17 (mouse)
Band	17|17 B3	Start	42,967,782 bp
Band	17|17 B3	End	43,003,175 bp
RNA expression pattern
Bgee	Human / Mouse (ortholog); Top expressed in: skin of abdomen; skin of leg; skin of arm; gingival epithelium; human penis; right uterine tube; amniotic fluid; skin of thigh; vagina; oral cavity / Top expressed in: decidua; skin of external ear; gastrula; lip; molar; skin of abdomen; skin of back; embryo; epidermis; hair follicle; More reference expression data
BioGPS	n/a
Gene ontology
Molecular function	G protein-coupled receptor activity; transmembrane signaling receptor activity; signal transducer activity
Cellular component	integral component of membrane; membrane
Biological process	G protein-coupled receptor signaling pathway; cell surface receptor signaling pathway; signal transduction
Sources:Amigo / QuickGO
Orthologs
Databases	NCBI: entry; OMA: entry
Species	Human	Mouse
Entrez	221393	78249
Ensembl	ENSG00000153294	ENSMUSG00000023918
UniProt	Q8IZF3	Q9D2L6
RefSeq (mRNA)	NM_153838; NM_001347855	NM_001289499; NM_001289500; NM_001289501; NM_030067
RefSeq (protein)	NP_001334784; NP_722580	NP_001276428; NP_001276429; NP_001276430; NP_084343
Location (UCSC)	Chr 6: 47.69 – 47.72 Mb	Chr 17: 42.97 – 43 Mb
PubMed search
- Wikidata
View/Edit Human	View/Edit Mouse

Adhesion G protein-coupled receptor F4 is a protein that in humans is encoded by the ADGRF4 gene (previously GPR115). The ADGRF4 protein is an orphan receptor which is part of the adhesion family of G protein-coupled receptors.
