= ADGRF3 =

Protein-coding gene in humans

Identifiers
- Aliases: ADGRF3, PGR23, hGPCR37, GPR113, adhesion G protein-coupled receptor F3
- External IDs: MGI: 2685887; GeneCards: ADGRF3

Gene location (Human)
Chr.	Chromosome 2 (human)
Band	2p23.3	Start	26,308,173 bp
Band	2p23.3	End	26,346,817 bp

Gene location (Mouse)
Chr.	Chromosome 5 (mouse)
Band	5|5 B1	Start	30,398,429 bp
Band	5|5 B1	End	30,410,720 bp
RNA expression pattern
Bgee	Human / Mouse (ortholog); Top expressed in: testicle; islet of Langerhans; right testis; left testis; bone marrow cell; ventricular zone; monocyte; right hemisphere of cerebellum; human kidney; right uterine tube / Top expressed in: spermatid; blastocyst; morula; embryo; testicle; spermatocyte; circulatory system; heart; ileum; spleen; More reference expression data
BioGPS	n/a
Gene ontology
Molecular function	G protein-coupled receptor activity; transmembrane signaling receptor activity; signal transducer activity
Cellular component	integral component of membrane; membrane
Biological process	G protein-coupled receptor signaling pathway; cell surface receptor signaling pathway; signal transduction
Sources:Amigo / QuickGO
Orthologs
Databases	NCBI: entry; OMA: entry
Species	Human	Mouse
Entrez	165082	381628
Ensembl	ENSG00000173567	ENSMUSG00000067642
UniProt	Q8IZF5	Q58Y75
RefSeq (mRNA)	NM_001145168; NM_001145169; NM_153835; NM_001321971; NM_001321975 NM_001393343	NM_001014394
RefSeq (protein)	NP_001138640; NP_001138641; NP_001308900; NP_001308904; NP_722577	NP_001014416
Location (UCSC)	Chr 2: 26.31 – 26.35 Mb	Chr 5: 30.4 – 30.41 Mb
PubMed search
- Wikidata
View/Edit Human	View/Edit Mouse

Adhesion G protein-coupled receptor F3 is a protein that in humans is encoded by the gene ADGRF3 (previously GPR113). The ADGRF3 protein is an orphan receptor that is part of the adhesion subfamily of G protein-coupled receptor.

== Gene ==
The human GPR113 gene is located on chromosome 2 (2p23.3). This gene spans the length of a 38.65kb region from base 26531041 to 26569685 on the negative strand. The GPR113 gene has two neighbors on either side on the negative strand: OTOF otoferlin preceding and HADHA hydroxyacyl-CoA following. Directly opposite the GPR113 on the positive strand is the EPT1 gene. The GPR113 gene is also known by the aliases PGR23 and HGPCR37.

== Evolution ==
The GPR113 has 5 human paralogs GPR110, GPR115, GPR128, GPR111, and GPR116. GPR113 is well conserved in mammals from primates to semi-aquatic species, as well as some amphibians. These include the Common Chimpanzee, the African Bush Elephant, the Platypus, and the Western Clawed Frog. Homologous domains that are well conserved throughout orthologs center in the 7 transmembrane receptor (Secretin family) region highlighted in purple in the figure.

== Protein ==
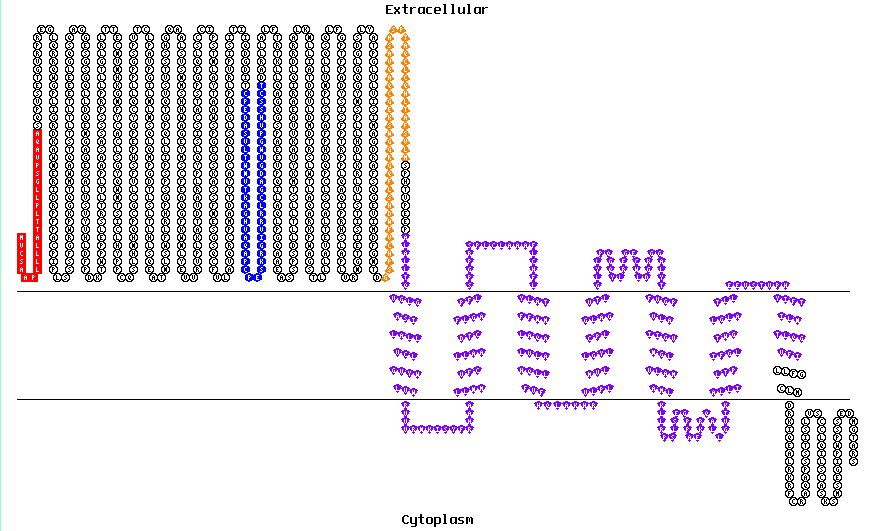
Annotated primary structure of the GPR113 protein

The protein product of GPR113 gene is a G-protein coupled receptor. The protein has three transcript variants in humans. Of these three, GPR113 Variant 1 has the longest amino acid sequence, and has the highest identity to orthologs. This leads to the conclusion that GPR113 Variant 1 is the homo sapiens descendant of the ancestral GPR113 gene. GPR113 Var 1 contains 1079 Amino Acids, and is integral to the plasma membrane. The 7-pass receptor contains 4 domains highlighted in the figure at right: Signal Peptide (Red), Hormone Receptor Domain (Blue), Latrophilin/CL-1-like GPS domain (Orange), and the 7-transmembrane receptor (Purple). Between the Hormone Receptor Domain and the GPS is a Domain of unknown function that is not highlighted.

== Clinical significance ==
The clinical significance of this protein has not been established, but GPR113 has been found to be expressed differentially under diseased conditions. Under the condition of Type 2 diabetes, the percentile rank relative to other transcripts decreases relative to normal cell function. The deletion of TP63, which mediates a wide variety of important body processes, also produces decreased GPR113 expression. In mice brains, the cerebellum and the olfactory bulb both show transcription of the GPR113 gene. Additionally, a study from the National Institute of Deafness and Other Communication Disorders has identified GPR113 expression to be highly restricted to a subset of taste receptor cells. This paper's conclusions, coupled with olfactory bulb expression levels, could provide an avenue for future research, potentially illuminating more about GPR113's function.
