= Latrophilin 2 =

Protein found in humans

ADGRL2

Identifiers
- Aliases: ADGRL2, CIRL2, CL2, LEC1, LPHH1, LPHN2, adhesion G protein-coupled receptor L2
- External IDs: OMIM: 607018; MGI: 2139714; GeneCards: ADGRL2

Gene location (Human)
Chr.	Chromosome 1 (human)
Band	1p31.1	Start	81,306,147 bp
Band	1p31.1	End	81,993,932 bp

Gene location (Mouse)
Chr.	Chromosome 3 (mouse)
Band	3|3 H3	Start	148,815,583 bp
Band	3|3 H3	End	148,990,555 bp
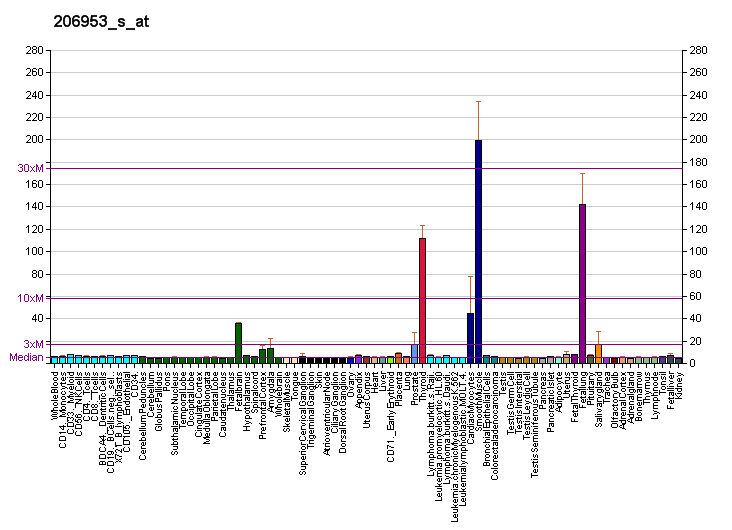
RNA expression pattern
Bgee	Human / Mouse (ortholog); Top expressed in: right lung; upper lobe of left lung; ventricular zone; left lobe of thyroid gland; right lobe of thyroid gland; left ovary; gastric mucosa; lower lobe of lung; ganglionic eminence; right ovary / Top expressed in: hand; maxillary prominence; left lung lobe; human fetus; mandibular prominence; renal corpuscle; skin of back; stria vascularis; umbilical cord; ventromedial nucleus; More reference expression data
BioGPS	More reference expression data
Gene ontology
Molecular function	G protein-coupled receptor activity; transmembrane signaling receptor activity; latrotoxin receptor activity; signal transducer activity; carbohydrate binding
Cellular component	integral component of membrane; membrane; intracellular anatomical structure; integral component of plasma membrane; neuron projection
Biological process	G protein-coupled receptor signaling pathway; cell surface receptor signaling pathway; signal transduction; adenylate cyclase-activating G protein-coupled receptor signaling pathway; brain development
Sources:Amigo / QuickGO
Orthologs
Databases	NCBI: entry; OMA: entry
Species	Human	Mouse
Entrez	23266	99633
Ensembl	ENSG00000117114	ENSMUSG00000028184
UniProt	O95490	Q8JZZ7
RefSeq (mRNA)	NM_001297704; NM_001297705; NM_001297706; NM_012302; NM_001330645 NM_001350698; NM_001350699; NM_001366002; NM_001366003; NM_001366004; NM_001366005; NM_001366006; NM_001366007; NM_001366008; NM_001366009; NM_001393349; NM_001393350; NM_001393351; NM_001393352; NM_001393353; NM_001393354	NM_001081298
RefSeq (protein)	NP_001284633; NP_001284634; NP_001284635; NP_001317574; NP_036434 NP_001337627; NP_001337628; NP_001352931; NP_001352932; NP_001352933; NP_001352934; NP_001352935; NP_001352936; NP_001352937; NP_001352938	NP_001074767; NP_001392915; NP_001392916; NP_001392917; NP_001392918 NP_001392919; NP_001392920; NP_001392921; NP_001392922; NP_001392923; NP_001392924; NP_001392925; NP_001392926; NP_001392927; NP_001392928; NP_001392929; NP_001392930; NP_001392931; NP_001392932; NP_001392933; NP_001392934; NP_001392935; NP_001392936; NP_001392937; NP_001392938; NP_001392939; NP_001392940; NP_001392947; NP_001392948
Location (UCSC)	Chr 1: 81.31 – 81.99 Mb	Chr 3: 148.82 – 148.99 Mb
PubMed search
- Wikidata
View/Edit Human	View/Edit Mouse

Latrophilin 2 is a protein that in humans is encoded by the ADGRL2 gene.

This gene encodes a member of the latrophilin subfamily of G-protein coupled receptors (GPCR). Latrophilins may function in both cell adhesion and signal transduction. In experiments with non-human species, endogenous proteolytic cleavage within a cysteine-rich GPS (G-protein-coupled-receptor proteolysis site) domain resulted in two subunits (a large extracellular N-terminal cell adhesion subunit and a subunit with substantial similarity to the secretin/calcitonin family of GPCRs) being non-covalently bound at the cell membrane. While several transcript variants have been described, the biological validity of only one has been determined.

== See also ==
- Adhesion G protein-coupled receptors
