= EMR3 =

Protein-coding gene in the species Homo sapiens

ADGRE3

Identifiers
- Aliases: ADGRE3, EMR3, adhesion G protein-coupled receptor E3
- External IDs: OMIM: 606101; GeneCards: ADGRE3

Gene location (Human)
Chr.	Chromosome 19 (human)
Band	19p13.12	Start	14,619,117 bp
Band	19p13.12	End	14,690,027 bp
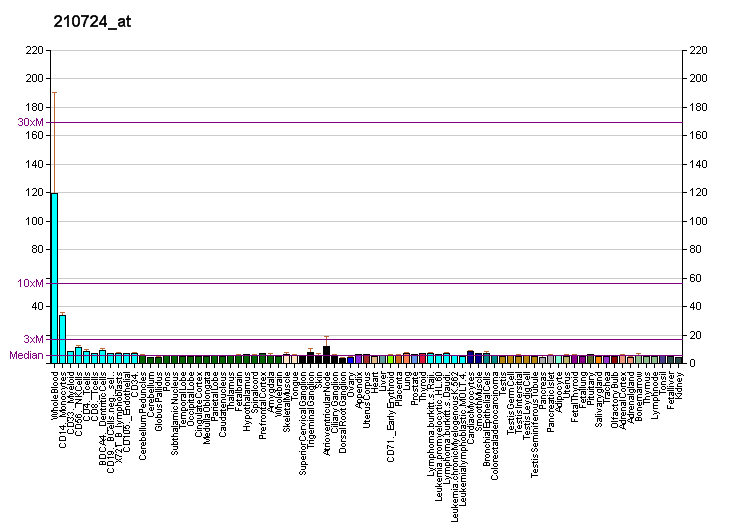
RNA expression pattern
Bgee	Human / Mouse (ortholog); Top expressed in: blood; monocyte; granulocyte; gonad; appendix; bone marrow; bone marrow cell; spleen; right lung; gallbladder / n/a; More reference expression data
BioGPS	More reference expression data
Gene ontology
Molecular function	calcium ion binding; G protein-coupled receptor activity; transmembrane signaling receptor activity; signal transducer activity
Cellular component	integral component of membrane; extracellular region; membrane; plasma membrane; secretory granule membrane; ficolin-1-rich granule membrane; integral component of plasma membrane
Biological process	G protein-coupled receptor signaling pathway; cell surface receptor signaling pathway; signal transduction; neutrophil degranulation; adenylate cyclase-activating G protein-coupled receptor signaling pathway
Sources:Amigo / QuickGO
Orthologs
Databases	NCBI: entry; OMA: entry
Species	Human	Mouse
Entrez	84658	n/a
Ensembl	ENSG00000131355	n/a
UniProt	Q9BY15	n/a
RefSeq (mRNA)	NM_001289158; NM_001289159; NM_032571; NM_152939	n/a
RefSeq (protein)	NP_001276087; NP_001276088; NP_115960	n/a
Location (UCSC)	Chr 19: 14.62 – 14.69 Mb	n/a
PubMed search		n/a
- Wikidata
View/Edit Human

EGF-like module-containing mucin-like hormone receptor-like 3 is a protein encoded by the ADGRE3 gene. EMR3 is a member of the adhesion GPCR family. Adhesion GPCRs are characterized by an extended extracellular region often possessing N-terminal protein modules that is linked to a TM7 region via a domain known as the GPCR-Autoproteolysis INducing (GAIN) domain.

EMR3 expression is restricted to monocytes/macrophages, myeloid dendritic cells, and mature granulocytes in human. Transcription of the EMR3 gene results in two alternative spliced forms: a surface protein with extracellular, 7TM, and intracellular domains as well as a truncated soluble form of only the extracellular domain. Mice, next to Emr2, lack the Emr3 gene.

== Function ==
The protein may play a role in myeloid-myeloid interactions during immune and inflammatory responses.

== Ligands ==
A potential ligand of EMR3 likely is expressed on human macrophage and activated neutrophils.
