= ADGRG1 =

Protein-coding gene in the species Homo sapiens

Identifiers
- Aliases: ADGRG1, BFPP, BPPR, TM7LN4, TM7XN1, GPR56, adhesion G protein-coupled receptor G1
- External IDs: OMIM: 604110; MGI: 1340051; GeneCards: ADGRG1

Gene location (Human)
Chr.	Chromosome 16 (human)
Band	16q21	Start	57,610,652 bp
Band	16q21	End	57,665,580 bp

Gene location (Mouse)
Chr.	Chromosome 8 (mouse)
Band	8 C5|8 47.12 cM	Start	95,701,379 bp
Band	8 C5|8 47.12 cM	End	95,740,845 bp
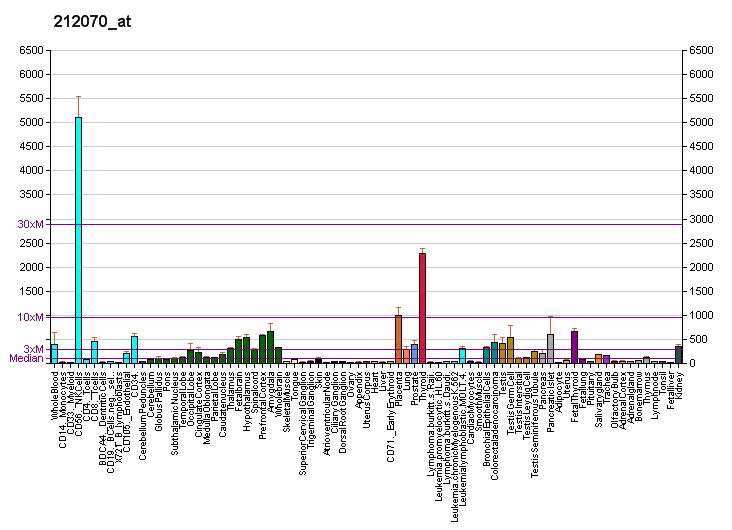

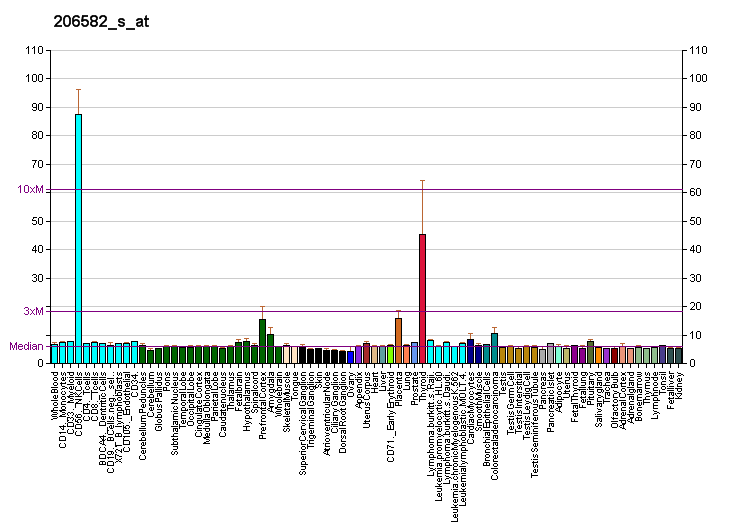
RNA expression pattern
Bgee	Human / Mouse (ortholog); Top expressed in: granulocyte; ganglionic eminence; ventricular zone; beta cell; renal medulla; right lobe of thyroid gland; left lobe of thyroid gland; human kidney; parotid gland; skin of arm / Top expressed in: oral mucosa; renal pelvis; ventricular zone; lip; right kidney; renal calyx; superior frontal gyrus; dorsomedial hypothalamic nucleus; primary visual cortex; ganglionic eminence; More reference expression data
BioGPS	More reference expression data
Gene ontology
Molecular function	signal transducer activity; transmembrane signaling receptor activity; collagen binding; extracellular matrix binding; G protein-coupled receptor activity; heparin binding
Cellular component	extracellular region; integral component of membrane; integral component of plasma membrane; membrane; plasma membrane; glial limiting end-foot; extracellular exosome; membrane raft; intracellular anatomical structure
Biological process	angiogenesis; negative regulation of cell population proliferation; signal transduction; cell-cell signaling; protein kinase C signaling; cerebral cortex radial glia-guided migration; multicellular organism development; cerebral cortex regionalization; positive regulation of neural precursor cell proliferation; brain development; cell surface receptor signaling pathway; nervous system development; negative regulation of neuron migration; layer formation in cerebral cortex; positive regulation of Rho protein signal transduction; cell differentiation; Rho protein signal transduction; positive regulation of cell adhesion; vascular endothelial growth factor production; G protein-coupled receptor signaling pathway; cell adhesion; cell migration; seminiferous tubule development; adenylate cyclase-activating G protein-coupled receptor signaling pathway
Sources:Amigo / QuickGO
Orthologs
Databases	NCBI: entry; OMA: entry
Species	Human	Mouse
Entrez	9289	14766
Ensembl	ENSG00000205336	ENSMUSG00000031785
UniProt	Q9Y653	Q8K209
RefSeq (mRNA)	NM_001145770; NM_001145771; NM_001145772; NM_001145773; NM_001145774 NM_001290142; NM_001290143; NM_001290144; NM_005682; NM_201524; NM_201525; NM_001370428; NM_001370431; NM_001370432; NM_001370433; NM_001370434; NM_001370435; NM_001370436; NM_001370437; NM_001370438; NM_001370439; NM_001370440; NM_001370441; NM_001370442; NM_001370451; NM_001370453; NM_001370454; NM_001370429; NM_001370430	NM_001198894; NM_018882
RefSeq (protein)	NP_001139242; NP_001139243; NP_001139244; NP_001139245; NP_001139246 NP_001277071; NP_001277072; NP_001277073; NP_005673; NP_958932; NP_958933; NP_001357357; NP_001357360; NP_001357361; NP_001357362; NP_001357363; NP_001357364; NP_001357365; NP_001357366; NP_001357367; NP_001357368; NP_001357369; NP_001357370; NP_001357371; NP_001357380; NP_001357382; NP_001357383; NP_001357358; NP_001357359	NP_001185823; NP_061370; NP_001390693; NP_001390694; NP_001390695 NP_001390696; NP_001390697; NP_001390698; NP_001390699; NP_001390700; NP_001390701; NP_001390705; NP_001390708; NP_001390709; NP_001390710; NP_001390711; NP_001390712; NP_001390713; NP_001390714; NP_001390715; NP_001390716; NP_001390717; NP_001390718; NP_001390719; NP_001390707
Location (UCSC)	Chr 16: 57.61 – 57.67 Mb	Chr 8: 95.7 – 95.74 Mb
PubMed search
- Wikidata
View/Edit Human	View/Edit Mouse

Adhesion G protein-coupled receptor G1 also known as GPR56 is a protein encoded by the ADGRG1 gene. ADGRG1 is a member of the adhesion GPCR family. Adhesion GPCRs are characterized by an extended extracellular region often possessing N-terminal protein modules that is linked to a TM7 region via a domain known as the GPCR-Autoproteolysis INducing (GAIN) domain.

ADGRG1 is expressed in liver, muscle, tendon, neural, and cytotoxic lymphoid cells in human as well as in hematopoietic precursor, muscle, and developing neural cells in the mouse. ADGRG1 has been shown to have numerous role in cell guidance/adhesion as exemplified by its roles in tumour inhibition and neuron development. More recently it has been shown to be a marker for cytotoxic T cells and a subgroup of Natural killer cells.

== Ligands ==
The ADGRG1 protein binds transglutaminase 2 to suppress tumor metastasis and binds collagen III to regulate cortical development and lamination.

== Signaling ==
The ADGRG1 protein couples to Gα_{q/11} protein upon association with the tetraspanins CD9 and CD81. Forced ADGRG1 expression activates NF-kB, PAI-1, and TCF transcriptional response elements. The splicing of ADGRG1 induces tumorigenic responses as a result of activating the transcription of genes, such as COX2, iNOS, and VEGF85. ADGRG1 couples to the Gα12/13 protein and activates RhoA and mammalian target of rapamycin (mTOR) pathway upon ligand binding. Lack of the N-terminal fragment (NTF) of ADGRG1 causes stronger RhoA signaling and β-arrestin accumulation, leading to extensive ubiquitination of the C-terminal fragment (CTF). Finally, ADGRG1 suppresses PKCα activation to regulate angiogenesis.

== Function ==
Studies in the hematopoietic system disclosed that during endothelial to hematopoietic stem cell transition, ADGRG1 is a transcriptional target of the heptad complex of hematopoietic transcription factors, and is required for hematopoietic cluster formation. Recently, two studies showed that ADGRG1, is a cell autonomous regulator of oligodendrocyte development through Gα_{12/13} proteins and Rho activation. Della Chiesa et al. demonstrate that ADGRG1 is expressed on CD56^{dull} natural killer (NK) cells. Lin and Hamann's group show all human cytotoxic lymphocytes, including CD56^{dull} NK cells and CD27^{–}CD45RA^{+} effector-type CD8^{+} T cells, express ADGRG1.

== Clinical significance ==
ADGRG1 was the first adhesion GPCR causally linked to a disease. Loss-of-function mutations in ADGRG1 cause a severe cortical malformation known as bilateral frontoparietal polymicrogyria (BFPP). Investigating the pathological mechanism of disease-associated ADGRG1 mutations in BFPP has provided mechanistic insights into the functioning of adhesion GPCRs. Researchers demonstrated that disease-associated ADGRG1 mutations cause BFPP via multiple mechanisms. Li et al. demonstrated that ADGRG1 regulates pial basement membrane (BM) organization during cortical development. Disruption of the Adgrg1 gene in mice leads to neuronal malformation in the cerebral cortex, which resulted in 4 critical pathological morphologies: defective pial BM, abnormal localized radial glial endfeet, malpositioned Cajal-Retzius cells, and overmigrated neurons. Furthermore, the interaction of ADGRG1 and collagen III inhibits neural migration to regulate lamination of the cerebral cortex. Next to ADGRG1, the α3β1 integrin is also involved in pial BM maintenance. Study from Itga3 (α3 integrin)/Adgrg1 double knockout mice showed increased neuronal overmigration compared to Adgrg1 single knockout mice, indicating cooperation of ADGRG1 and α3β1 integrin in modulation of the development of the cerebral cortex. More recently, the Walsh laboratory showed that alternative splicing of ADGRG1 regulates regional cerebral cortical patterning.

In depression patients, blood ADGRG1 mRNA expression increases only in responders and not non-responders to serotonin-norepinephrine reuptake inhibitor treatment. Furthermore, ADGRG1 was down-regulated in the prefrontal cortex of individuals with depression that died by suicide.

Outside the nervous system, ADGRG1 has been linked to muscle function and male fertility. The expression of ADGRG1 is upregulated during early differentiation of human myoblasts. Investigation of Adgrg1 knockout mice and BFPP patients showed that ADGRG1 is required for in vitro myoblast fusion via signaling of serum response factor (SRF) and nuclear factor of activated T-cell (NFAT), but is not essential for muscle development in vivo. Additionally, ADGRG1 is a transcriptional target of peroxisome proliferator-activated receptor gamma coactivator 1-alpha 4 and regulates overload-induced muscle hypertrophy through Gα_{12/13} and mTOR signaling. Therefore, the study of knockout mice revealed that ADGRG1 is involved in testis development and male fertility. In melanocytic cells ADGRG1 gene expression may be regulated by MITF.

Mutations in ADGRG1 cause the brain developmental disorder BFPP, characterized by disordered cortical lamination in frontal cortex. Mice lacking expression of ADGRG1 develop a comparable phenotype. Furthermore, loss of ADGRG1 leads to reduced fertility in male mice, resulting from a defect in seminiferous tubule development. ADGRG1 is expressed in glioblastoma/astrocytoma as well as in esophageal squamous cell, breast, colon, non-small cell lung, ovarian, and pancreatic carcinoma. ADGRG1 was shown to localize together with α-actinin at the leading edge of membrane filopodia in glioblastoma cells, suggesting a role in cell adhesion/migration. In addition, recombinant ADGRG1-NTF protein interacts with glioma cells to inhibit cellular adhesion. Inactivation of Von Hippel-Lindau (VHL) tumor-suppressor gene and hypoxia suppressed ADGRG1 in a renal cell carcinoma cell line, but hypoxia influenced ADGRG1 expression in breast or bladder cancer cell lines. ADGRG1 is a target gene for vezatin, an adherens junctions transmembrane protein, which is a tumor suppressor in gastric cancer. Xu et al. used an in vivo metastatic model of human melanoma to show that ADGRG1 is downregulated in highly metastatic cells. Later, by ectopic expression and RNA interference they confirmed that ADGRG1 inhibits melanoma tumor growth and metastasis. Silenced expression of ADGRG1 in HeLa cells enhanced apoptosis and anoikis, but suppressed anchorage-independent growth and cell adhesion. High ecotropic viral integration site-1 acute myeloid leukemia (EVI1-high AML) expresses ADGRG1 that was found to be a transcriptional target of EVI1. Silencing expression of ADGRG1 decreases adhesion, cell growth and induces apoptosis through reduced RhoA signaling. ADGRG1 suppresses the angiogenesis and melanoma growth through inhibition of vascular endothelial growth factor (VEGF) via PKCα signaling pathway. Furthermore, ADGRG1 expression was found to be negatively correlated with the malignancy of melanomas in human patients.
