= ADGRF2P =

Protein-coding gene in the species Homo sapiens

Identifiers
- Aliases: ADGRF2P, PGR20, hGPCR35, GPR111, adhesion G protein-coupled receptor F2, ADGRF2, adhesion G protein-coupled receptor F2, pseudogene
- External IDs: MGI: 2182728; GeneCards: ADGRF2P

Gene location (Human)
Chr.	Chromosome 6 (human)
Band	6p12.3	Start	47,656,487 bp
Band	6p12.3	End	47,695,192 bp

Gene location (Mouse)
Chr.	Chromosome 17 (mouse)
Band	17|17 B3	Start	43,007,021 bp
Band	17|17 B3	End	43,053,070 bp
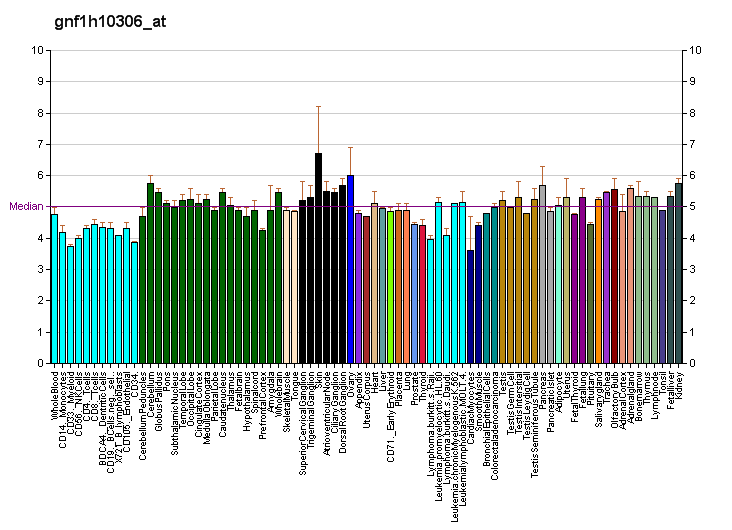

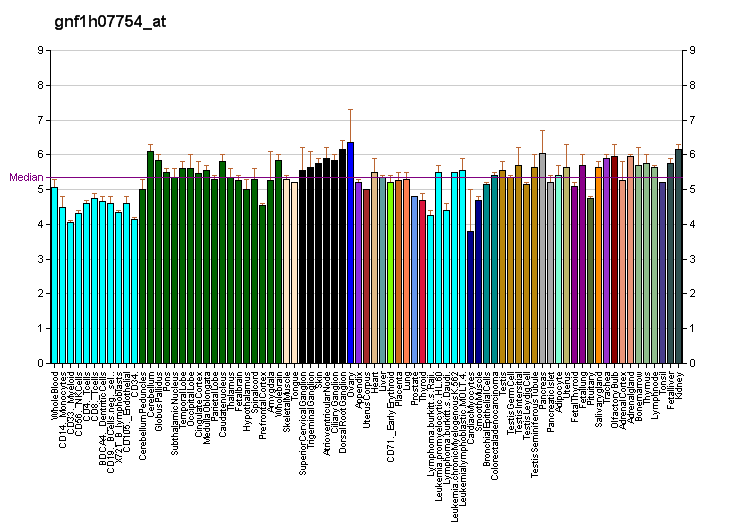
RNA expression pattern
Bgee	Human / Mouse (ortholog); Top expressed in: testicle; right uterine tube; skin of leg; skin of abdomen; apex of heart; olfactory zone of nasal mucosa; left ventricle; ganglionic eminence; right auricle of heart; muscle of leg / Top expressed in: esophagus; lip; zone of skin; embryo; muscle of thigh; cerebellar cortex; quadriceps femoris muscle; neural layer of retina; olfactory bulb; muscle tissue; More reference expression data
BioGPS	More reference expression data
Gene ontology
Molecular function	G protein-coupled receptor activity; transmembrane signaling receptor activity; signal transducer activity
Cellular component	integral component of membrane; membrane
Biological process	G protein-coupled receptor signaling pathway; cell surface receptor signaling pathway; signal transduction
Sources:Amigo / QuickGO
Orthologs
Databases	NCBI: entry; OMA: entry
Species	Human	Mouse
Entrez	222611	435529
Ensembl	ENSG00000164393	ENSMUSG00000057899
UniProt	Q8IZF7	E9Q4J9
RefSeq (mRNA)	NM_153839; NM_001368115; NM_001394650	NM_001033493
RefSeq (protein)	NP_722581; NP_001355044	NP_001028665
Location (UCSC)	Chr 6: 47.66 – 47.7 Mb	Chr 17: 43.01 – 43.05 Mb
PubMed search
- Wikidata
View/Edit Human	View/Edit Mouse

Adhesion G protein-coupled receptor F2, pseudogene (ADGRF2P) is a putative pseudogene found in humans, and previously called ADGRF2 or GPR111. Protein-coding orthologs exist in other species.
