= GAIN domain =

Protein domain

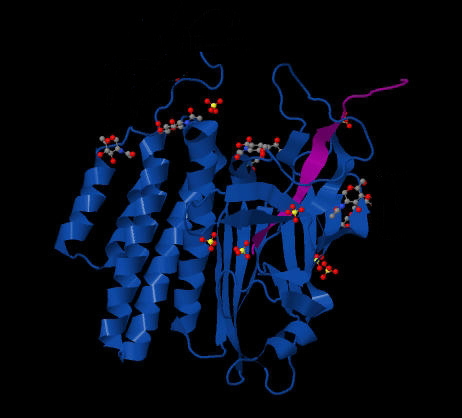
GPCR-Autoproteolsis INducing (GAIN) domain, rat latrophilin 4DLQ mediates autocatalytic cleavage of adhesion GPCRs

The GAIN domain (G-protein-coupled receptor (GPCR) autoproteolysis-inducing domain) is a protein domain found in a number of cell surface receptors, including adhesion-GPCRs and polycystic kidney disease proteins PKD1 and PKD2. The domain is involved in the self-cleavage of these transmembrane receptors, and has been shown to be crucial for their function. Point mutations within the GAIN domain of PKD1 and GPR56 are known to cause polycystic kidney disease and polymicrogyria, respectively.
