= Signal transduction =

Cascade of intracellular and molecular events for transmission/amplification of signals

Simplified representation of major signal transduction pathways in mammals

Signal transduction is the process by which a chemical or physical signal is transmitted through a cell as a series of molecular events. Proteins responsible for detecting stimuli are generally termed receptors, although in some cases the term sensor is used. The changes elicited by ligand binding (or signal sensing) in a receptor give rise to a biochemical cascade, which is a chain of biochemical events known as a signaling pathway.

When signaling pathways interact with one another they form networks, which allow cellular responses to be coordinated, often by combinatorial signaling events. At the molecular level, such responses include changes in the transcription or translation of genes, and post-translational and conformational changes in proteins, as well as changes in their location. These molecular events are the basic mechanisms controlling cell growth, proliferation, metabolism and many other processes. In multicellular organisms, signal transduction pathways regulate cell communication in many ways.

Each component (or node) of a signaling pathway is classified according to the role it plays with respect to the initial stimulus. Ligands are termed first messengers, while receptors are the signal transducers, which then activate primary effectors. Such effectors are typically proteins and are often linked to second messengers, which can activate secondary effectors, and so on. Depending on the efficiency of the nodes, a signal can be amplified (a concept known as signal gain), so that one signaling molecule can generate a response involving hundreds to millions of molecules. As with other signals, the transduction of biological signals is characterised by delay, noise, signal feedback and feedforward and interference, which can range from negligible to pathological. With the advent of computational biology, the analysis of signaling pathways and networks has become an essential tool to understand cellular functions and disease, including signaling rewiring mechanisms underlying responses to acquired drug resistance.

== Stimuli ==
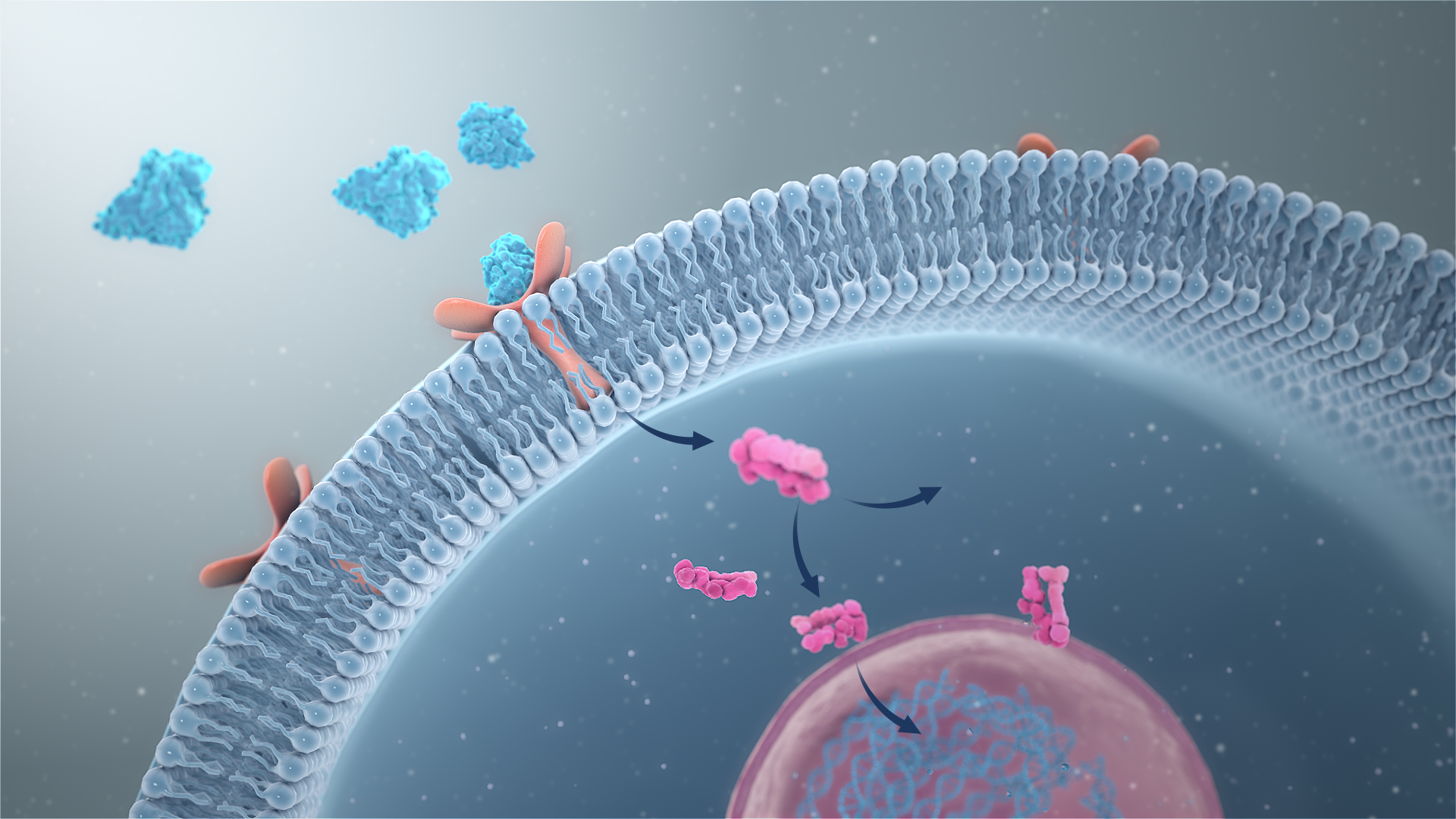
3D medical animation still showing signal transduction

The basis for signal transduction is the transformation of a certain stimulus into a biochemical signal. The nature of such stimuli can vary widely, ranging from extracellular cues, such as the presence of epidermal growth factor (EGF), to intracellular events, such as the DNA damage resulting from replicative telomere attrition. Traditionally, signals that reach the central nervous system are classified as senses. These are transmitted from neuron to neuron in a process called synaptic transmission. Many other intercellular signal relay mechanisms exist in multicellular organisms, such as those that govern embryonic development.

=== Ligands ===
The majority of signal transduction pathways involve the binding of signaling molecules, known as ligands, to receptors that trigger events inside the cell. The binding of a signaling molecule with a receptor causes a change in the conformation of the receptor, known as receptor activation. Most ligands are soluble molecules from the extracellular medium which bind to cell surface receptors. These include growth factors, cytokines and neurotransmitters. Components of the extracellular matrix such as fibronectin and hyaluronan can also bind to such receptors (integrins and CD44, respectively). In addition, some molecules such as steroid hormones are lipid-soluble and thus cross the plasma membrane to reach cytoplasmic or nuclear receptors. In the case of steroid hormone receptors, their stimulation leads to binding to the promoter region of steroid-responsive genes.

Not all classifications of signaling molecules take into account the molecular nature of each class member. For example, odorants belong to a wide range of molecular classes, as do neurotransmitters, which range in size from small molecules such as dopamine to neuropeptides such as endorphins. Moreover, some molecules may fit into more than one class, e.g. epinephrine is a neurotransmitter when secreted by the central nervous system and a hormone when secreted by the adrenal medulla.

Some receptors such as HER2 are capable of ligand-independent activation when overexpressed or mutated. This leads to constitutive activation of the pathway, which may or may not be overturned by compensation mechanisms. In the case of HER2, which acts as a dimerization partner of other epidermal growth factor receptors (EGFR), constitutive activation leads to hyperproliferation and cancer.

=== Mechanical forces ===
The prevalence of basement membranes in the tissues of eumetazoans means that most cell types require attachment to survive. This requirement has led to the development of complex mechanotransduction pathways, allowing cells to sense the stiffness of the substratum. Such signaling is mainly orchestrated in focal adhesions, regions where the integrin-bound actin cytoskeleton detects changes and transmits them downstream through YAP1. Calcium-dependent cell adhesion molecules such as cadherins and selectins can also mediate mechanotransduction. Specialised forms of mechanotransduction within the nervous system are responsible for mechanosensation: hearing, touch, proprioception and balance.

=== Osmolarity ===
Cellular and systemic control of osmotic pressure (the difference in osmolarity between the cytosol and the extracellular medium) is critical for homeostasis. There are three ways in which cells can detect osmotic stimuli: as changes in macromolecular crowding, ionic strength, and changes in the properties of the plasma membrane or cytoskeleton (the latter being a form of mechanotransduction). These changes are detected by proteins known as osmosensors or osmoreceptors. In humans, the best characterised osmosensors are transient receptor potential channels present in the primary cilium of human cells. In yeast, the HOG pathway has been extensively characterised.

=== Temperature ===
The sensing of temperature in cells is known as thermoception and is primarily mediated by transient receptor potential channels. Additionally, animal cells contain a conserved mechanism to prevent high temperatures from causing cellular damage, the heat-shock response. Such response is triggered when high temperatures cause the dissociation of inactive HSF1 from complexes with heat shock proteins Hsp40/Hsp70 and Hsp90. With help from the ncRNA hsr1, HSF1 then trimerizes, becoming active and upregulating the expression of its target genes. Many other thermosensory mechanisms exist in both prokaryotes and eukaryotes.

=== Light ===
In mammals, light controls the sense of sight and the circadian clock by activating light-sensitive proteins in photoreceptor cells in the eye's retina. In the case of vision, light is detected by rhodopsin in rod and cone cells. In the case of the circadian clock, a different photopigment, melanopsin, is responsible for detecting light in intrinsically photosensitive retinal ganglion cells.

== Receptors ==
Receptors can be roughly divided into two major classes: intracellular and extracellular receptors.

=== Extracellular receptors ===
Extracellular receptors are integral transmembrane proteins and make up most receptors. They span the plasma membrane of the cell, with one part of the receptor on the outside and the other on the inside. Signal transduction occurs as a result of a ligand binding to the outside region of the receptor (the ligand does not pass through the membrane). Ligand-receptor binding induces a change in the conformation of the inside part of the receptor, a process sometimes called "receptor activation". This results in either the activation of an enzyme domain of the receptor or the exposure of a binding site for other intracellular signaling proteins within the cell, eventually propagating the signal through the cytoplasm. In eukaryotic cells, most intracellular proteins activated by a ligand/receptor interaction possess an enzymatic activity; examples include tyrosine kinase and phosphatases. Often, such enzymes are covalently linked to the receptor. Some of them create second messengers such as cyclic AMP and IP_{3}, the latter controlling the release of intracellular calcium stores into the cytoplasm. Other activated proteins interact with adaptor proteins that facilitate signaling protein interactions and coordination of signaling complexes necessary to respond to a particular stimulus. Enzymes and adaptor proteins are both responsive to various second messenger molecules.

Many adaptor proteins and enzymes activated as part of signal transduction possess specialized protein domains that bind to specific secondary messenger molecules. For example, calcium ions bind to the EF hand domains of calmodulin, allowing it to bind and activate calmodulin-dependent kinase. PIP_{3} and other phosphoinositides do the same thing to the Pleckstrin homology domains of proteins such as the kinase protein AKT.

==== G protein–coupled receptors ====
G protein–coupled receptors (GPCRs) are a family of integral transmembrane proteins that possess seven transmembrane domains and are linked to a heterotrimeric G protein. With nearly 800 members, this is the largest family of membrane proteins and receptors in mammals. Counting all animal species, they total over 5000. Mammalian GPCRs are classified into five major families: rhodopsin-like, secretin-like, metabotropic glutamate, adhesion and frizzled/smoothened, with a few GPCR groups being difficult to classify due to low sequence similarity, e.g. vomeronasal receptors. Other classes exist in eukaryotes, such as the Dictyostelium cyclic AMP receptors and fungal mating pheromone receptors.

Signal transduction by a GPCR begins with an inactive G protein coupled to the receptor; the G protein exists as a heterotrimer consisting of Gα, Gβ, and Gγ subunits. Once the GPCR recognizes a ligand, the conformation of the receptor changes to activate the G protein, causing Gα to bind a molecule of guanosine triphosphate (GTP) and dissociate from the other two G-protein subunits. The dissociation exposes sites on the subunits that can interact with other molecules. The activated G protein subunits detach from the receptor and initiate signaling from many downstream effector proteins such as phospholipases and ion channels, the latter permitting the release of second messenger molecules. The total strength of signal amplification by a GPCR is determined by the lifetimes of the ligand-receptor complex and receptor-effector protein complex and the deactivation time of the activated receptor and effectors through intrinsic enzymatic activity; e.g. via protein kinase phosphorylation or b-arrestin-dependent internalization.

A study was conducted where a point mutation was inserted into the gene encoding the chemokine receptor CXCR2; mutated cells underwent a malignant transformation due to the expression of CXCR2 in an active conformation despite the absence of chemokine-binding. This meant that chemokine receptors can contribute to cancer development.

==== Tyrosine, Ser/Thr and histidine-specific protein kinases ====
Receptor tyrosine kinases (RTKs) are transmembrane proteins with an intracellular kinase domain and an extracellular domain that binds ligands; examples include growth factor receptors such as the insulin receptor. To perform signal transduction, RTKs need to form dimers in the plasma membrane; the dimer is stabilized by ligands binding to the receptor. The interaction between the cytoplasmic domains stimulates the autophosphorylation of tyrosine residues within the intracellular kinase domains of the RTKs, causing conformational changes. Subsequent to this, the receptors' kinase domains are activated, initiating phosphorylation signaling cascades of downstream cytoplasmic molecules that facilitate various cellular processes such as cell differentiation and metabolism. Many Ser/Thr and dual-specificity protein kinases are important for signal transduction, either acting downstream of [receptor tyrosine kinases], or as membrane-embedded or cell-soluble versions in their own right. The process of signal transduction involves around 560 known protein kinases and pseudokinases, encoded by the human kinome

As is the case with GPCRs, proteins that bind GTP play a major role in signal transduction from the activated RTK into the cell. In this case, the G proteins are members of the Ras, Rho, and Raf families, referred to collectively as small G proteins. They act as molecular switches usually tethered to membranes by isoprenyl groups linked to their carboxyl ends. Upon activation, they assign proteins to specific membrane subdomains where they participate in signaling. Activated RTKs in turn activate small G proteins that activate guanine nucleotide exchange factors such as SOS1. Once activated, these exchange factors can activate more small G proteins, thus amplifying the receptor's initial signal. The mutation of certain RTK genes, as with that of GPCRs, can result in the expression of receptors that exist in a constitutively activated state; such mutated genes may act as oncogenes.

Histidine-specific protein kinases are structurally distinct from other protein kinases and are found in prokaryotes, fungi, and plants as part of a two-component signal transduction mechanism: a phosphate group from ATP is first added to a histidine residue within the kinase, then transferred to an aspartate residue on a receiver domain on a different protein or the kinase itself, thus activating the aspartate residue.

==== Integrins ====
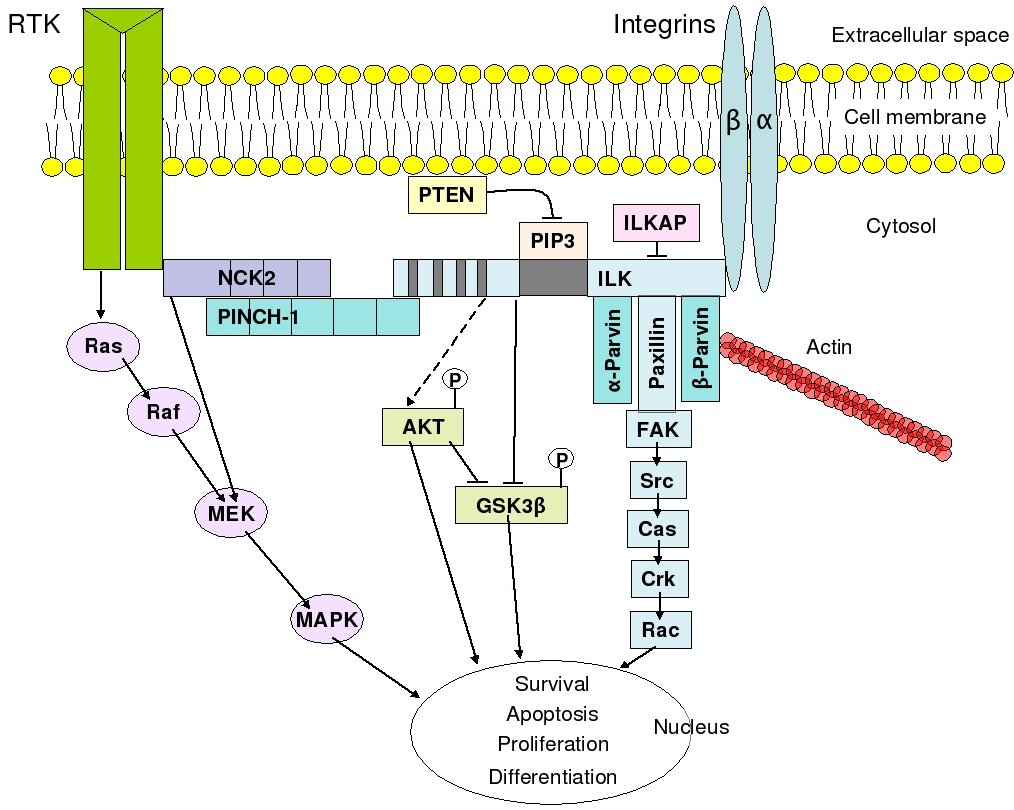
An overview of integrin-mediated signal transduction, adapted from Hehlgens et al. (2007)

Integrins are produced by a wide variety of cells; they play a role in cell attachment to other cells and the extracellular matrix and in the transduction of signals from extracellular matrix components such as fibronectin and collagen. Ligand binding to the extracellular domain of integrins changes the protein's conformation, clustering it at the cell membrane to initiate signal transduction. Integrins lack kinase activity; hence, integrin-mediated signal transduction is achieved through a variety of intracellular protein kinases and adaptor molecules, the main coordinator being integrin-linked kinase. As shown in the adjacent picture, cooperative integrin-RTK signaling determines the timing of cellular survival, apoptosis, proliferation, and differentiation.

Important differences exist between integrin-signaling in circulating blood cells and non-circulating cells such as epithelial cells; integrins of circulating cells are normally inactive. For example, cell membrane integrins on circulating leukocytes are maintained in an inactive state to avoid epithelial cell attachment; they are activated only in response to stimuli such as those received at the site of an inflammatory response. In a similar manner, integrins at the cell membrane of circulating platelets are normally kept inactive to avoid thrombosis. Epithelial cells (which are non-circulating) normally have active integrins at their cell membrane, helping maintain their stable adhesion to underlying stromal cells that provide signals to maintain normal functioning.

In plants, there are no bona fide integrin receptors identified to date; nevertheless, several integrin-like proteins were proposed based on structural homology with the metazoan receptors. Plants contain integrin-linked kinases that are very similar in their primary structure with the animal ILKs. In the experimental model plant Arabidopsis thaliana, one of the integrin-linked kinase genes, ILK1, has been shown to be a critical element in the plant immune response to signal molecules from bacterial pathogens and plant sensitivity to salt and osmotic stress. ILK1 protein interacts with the high-affinity potassium transporter HAK5 and with the calcium sensor CML9.

==== Toll-like receptors ====
When activated, toll-like receptors (TLRs) take adapter molecules within the cytoplasm of cells in order to propagate a signal. Five adaptor molecules are known to be involved in signaling, which are Myd88, TIRAP, TRIF, TRAM, and SARM1. These adapters activate other intracellular molecules such as IRAK1, IRAK4, TBK1, and IKKi that amplify the signal, eventually leading to the induction or suppression of genes that cause certain responses. Thousands of genes are activated by TLR signaling, implying that this method constitutes an important gateway for gene modulation.

==== Ligand-gated ion channels ====
A ligand-gated ion channel, upon binding with a ligand, changes conformation to open a channel in the cell membrane through which ions relaying signals can pass. An example of this mechanism is found in the receiving cell of a neural synapse. The influx of ions that occurs in response to the opening of these channels induces action potentials, such as those that travel along nerves, by depolarizing the membrane of post-synaptic cells, resulting in the opening of voltage-gated ion channels.

An example of an ion allowed into the cell during a ligand-gated ion channel opening is Ca^{2+}; it acts as a second messenger initiating signal transduction cascades and altering the physiology of the responding cell. This results in amplification of the synapse response between synaptic cells by remodelling the dendritic spines involved in the synapse.

=== Intracellular receptors ===
Intracellular receptors, such as nuclear receptors and cytoplasmic receptors, are soluble proteins localized within their respective areas. The typical ligands for nuclear receptors are non-polar hormones like the steroid hormones testosterone and progesterone and derivatives of vitamins A and D. To initiate signal transduction, the ligand must pass through the plasma membrane by passive diffusion. On binding with the receptor, the ligands pass through the nuclear membrane into the nucleus, altering gene expression.

Activated nuclear receptors attach to the DNA at receptor-specific hormone-responsive element (HRE) sequences, located in the promoter region of the genes activated by the hormone-receptor complex. Due to their enabling gene transcription, they are alternatively called inductors of gene expression. All hormones that act by regulation of gene expression have two consequences in their mechanism of action; their effects are produced after a characteristically long period of time and their effects persist for another long period of time, even after their concentration has been reduced to zero, due to a relatively slow turnover of most enzymes and proteins that would either deactivate or terminate ligand binding onto the receptor.

Nucleic receptors have DNA-binding domains containing zinc fingers and a ligand-binding domain; the zinc fingers stabilize DNA binding by holding its phosphate backbone. DNA sequences that match the receptor are usually hexameric repeats of any kind; the sequences are similar but their orientation and distance differentiate them. The ligand-binding domain is additionally responsible for dimerization of nucleic receptors prior to binding and providing structures for transactivation used for communication with the translational apparatus.

Steroid receptors are a subclass of nuclear receptors located primarily within the cytosol. In the absence of steroids, they associate in an aporeceptor complex containing chaperone or heatshock proteins (HSPs). The HSPs are necessary to activate the receptor by assisting the protein to fold in a way such that the signal sequence enabling its passage into the nucleus is accessible. Steroid receptors, on the other hand, may be repressive on gene expression when their transactivation domain is hidden. Receptor activity can be enhanced by phosphorylation of serine residues at their N-terminal as a result of another signal transduction pathway, a process called crosstalk.

Retinoic acid receptors are another subset of nuclear receptors. They can be activated by an endocrine-synthesized ligand that entered the cell by diffusion, a ligand synthesised from a precursor like retinol brought to the cell through the bloodstream or a completely intracellularly synthesised ligand like prostaglandin. These receptors are located in the nucleus and are not accompanied by HSPs. They repress their gene by binding to their specific DNA sequence when no ligand binds to them, and vice versa.

Certain intracellular receptors of the immune system are cytoplasmic receptors; recently identified NOD-like receptors (NLRs) reside in the cytoplasm of some eukaryotic cells and interact with ligands using a leucine-rich repeat (LRR) motif similar to TLRs. Some of these molecules like NOD2 interact with RIP2 kinase that activates NF-κB signaling, whereas others like NALP3 interact with inflammatory caspases and initiate processing of particular cytokines like interleukin-1β.

== Second messengers ==
First messengers are the signaling molecules (hormones, neurotransmitters, and paracrine/autocrine agents) that reach the cell from the extracellular fluid and bind to their specific receptors. Second messengers are the substances that enter the cytoplasm and act within the cell to trigger a response. In essence, second messengers act as chemical relays from the plasma membrane to the cytoplasm, thus carrying out intracellular signal transduction.

=== Calcium ===
The release of calcium ions from the endoplasmic reticulum into the cytosol results in its binding to signaling proteins that are then activated; it is then sequestered in the smooth endoplasmic reticulum and the mitochondria. Two combined receptor/ion channel proteins control the transport of calcium: the InsP_{3}-receptor that transports calcium upon interaction with inositol triphosphate on its cytosolic side; and the ryanodine receptor named after the alkaloid ryanodine, similar to the InsP_{3} receptor but having a feedback mechanism that releases more calcium upon binding with it. The nature of calcium in the cytosol means that it is active for only a very short time, meaning its free state concentration is very low and is mostly bound to organelle molecules like calreticulin when inactive

Calcium is involved in numerous cellular processes, including muscle contraction, neurotransmitter release from nerve endings, and cell migration. Its activation is primarily mediated through three main pathways: G-protein–coupled receptor (GPCR) pathways, receptor tyrosine kinase (RTK) pathways, and gated ion channels. Calcium regulates proteins either directly or indirectly by binding to enzymes such as calmodulin-dependent kinases.

=== Lipid messengers ===
Lipophilic second messenger molecules are derived from lipids residing in cellular membranes; enzymes stimulated by activated receptors activate the lipids by modifying them. Examples include diacylglycerol and ceramide, the former required for the activation of protein kinase C.

=== Nitric oxide ===
Nitric oxide (NO) acts as a second messenger because it is a free radical that can diffuse through the plasma membrane and affect nearby cells. It is synthesised from arginine and oxygen by the NO synthase and works through activation of soluble guanylyl cyclase, which, when activated, produces another second messenger, cGMP. NO can also act through covalent modification of proteins or their metal cofactors; some have a redox mechanism and are reversible. It is toxic in high concentrations and causes damage during stroke, but is the cause of many other functions like the relaxation of blood vessels, apoptosis, and penile erections.

=== Redox signaling ===
In addition to nitric oxide, other electronically activated species are also signal-transducing agents in a process called redox signaling. Examples include superoxide, hydrogen peroxide, carbon monoxide, and hydrogen sulfide. Redox signaling also includes active modulation of electronic flows in semiconductive biological macromolecules.

== Cellular responses ==
Gene activations and metabolism alterations are examples of cellular responses to extracellular stimulation that require signal transduction. Gene activation leads to further cellular effects, since the products of responding genes include instigators of activation; transcription factors produced as a result of a signal transduction cascade can activate even more genes. Hence, an initial stimulus can trigger the expression of a large number of genes, leading to physiological events like the increased uptake of glucose from the blood stream and the migration of neutrophils to sites of infection. The set of genes and their activation order to certain stimuli is referred to as a genetic program.

Mammalian cells require stimulation for cell division and survival; in the absence of growth factor, apoptosis ensues. Such requirements for extracellular stimulation are necessary for controlling cell behavior in unicellular and multicellular organisms; signal transduction pathways are perceived to be so central to biological processes that a large number of diseases are attributed to their dysregulation. Three basic signals determine cellular growth:

- Stimulatory (growth factors)
  - Transcription dependent response
    For example, steroids act directly as transcription factor (gives slow response, as transcription factor must bind DNA, which needs to be transcribed. Produced mRNA needs to be translated, and the produced protein/peptide can undergo posttranslational modification (PTM))
  - Transcription independent response
    For example, epidermal growth factor (EGF) binds the epidermal growth factor receptor (EGFR), which causes dimerization and autophosphorylation of the EGFR, which in turn activates the intracellular signaling pathway .
- Inhibitory (cell-cell contact)
- Permissive (cell-matrix interactions)

The combination of these signals is integrated into altered cytoplasmic machinery which leads to altered cell behaviour.

== Major pathways ==
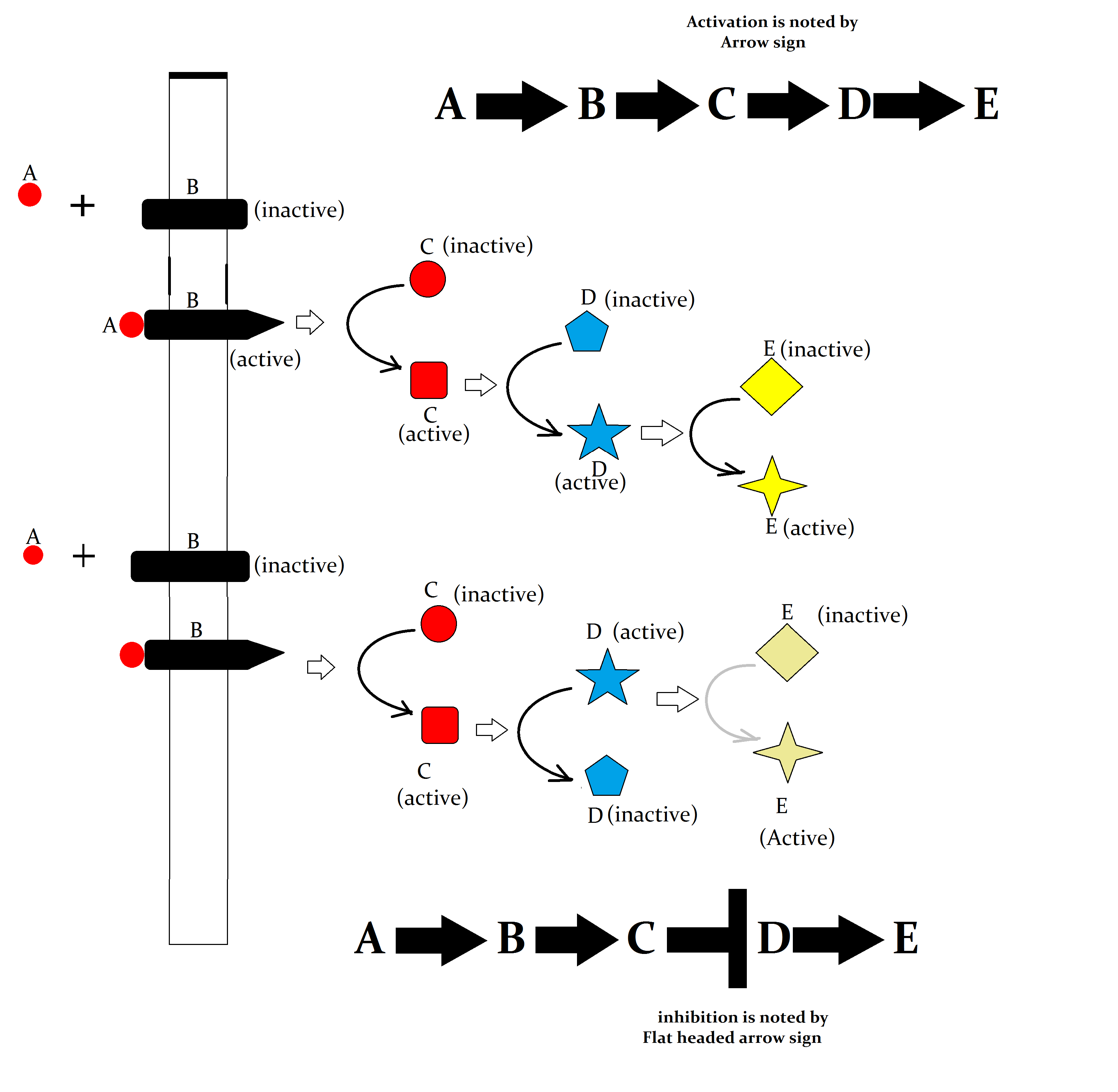
How to read signal transduction diagrams, what does normal arrow and flathead arrow means

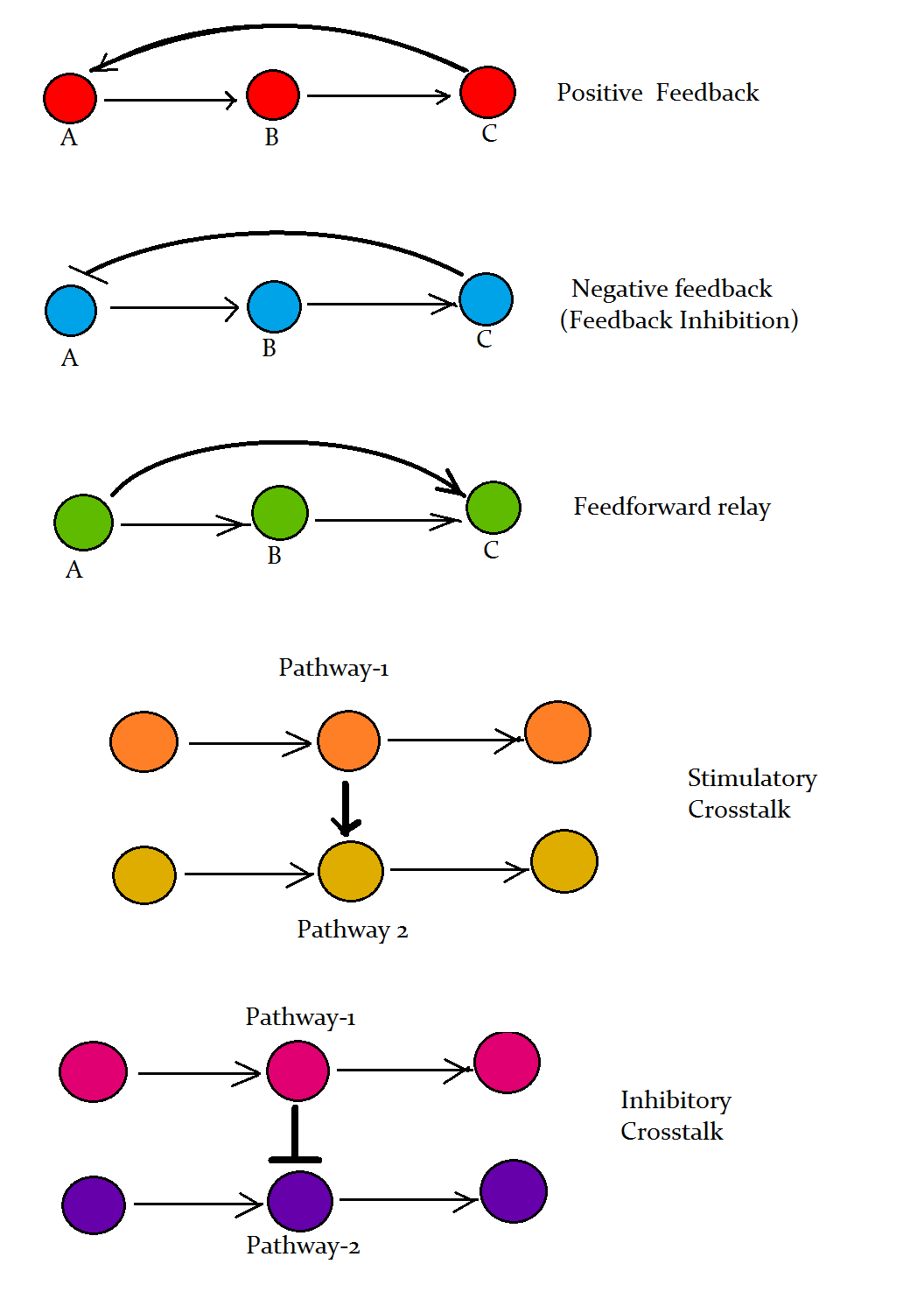
Elements of signal transduction cascade networking

Following are some major signaling pathways, demonstrating how ligands binding to their receptors can affect second messengers and eventually result in altered cellular responses.

- MAPK/ERK pathway: A pathway that couples intracellular responses to the binding of growth factors to cell surface receptors. This pathway is very complex and includes many protein components. In many cell types, activation of this pathway promotes cell division, and many forms of cancer are associated with aberrations in it.
- cAMP-dependent pathway: In humans, cAMP works by activating protein kinase A (PKA, cAMP-dependent protein kinase) (see picture), and, thus, further effects depend mainly on cAMP-dependent protein kinase, which vary based on the type of cell.
- IP_{3}/DAG pathway: PLC cleaves the phospholipid phosphatidylinositol 4,5-bisphosphate (PIP_{2}), yielding diacyl glycerol (DAG) and inositol 1,4,5-triphosphate (IP_{3}). DAG remains bound to the membrane, and IP_{3} is released as a soluble structure into the cytosol. IP_{3} then diffuses through the cytosol to bind to IP_{3} receptors, particular calcium channels in the endoplasmic reticulum (ER). These channels are specific to calcium and allow the passage of only calcium to move through. This causes the cytosolic concentration of Calcium to increase, causing a cascade of intracellular changes and activity. In addition, calcium and DAG together works to activate PKC, which goes on to phosphorylate other molecules, leading to altered cellular activity. End-effects include taste, manic depression, tumor promotion, etc.

== History ==
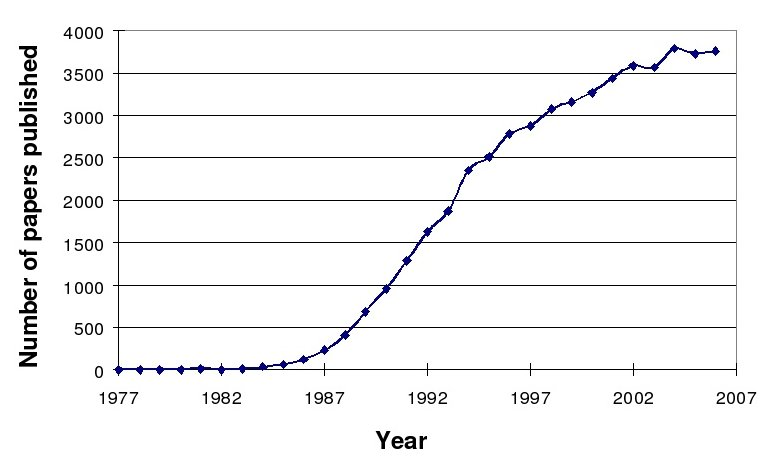
Occurrence of the term "signal transduction" in MEDLINE-indexed papers since 1977

The earliest notion of signal transduction can be traced back to 1855, when Claude Bernard proposed that ductless glands such as the spleen, the thyroid and adrenal glands, were responsible for the release of "internal secretions" with physiological effects. Bernard's "secretions" were later named "hormones" by Ernest Starling in 1905. Together with William Bayliss, Starling had discovered secretin in 1902. Although many other hormones, most notably insulin, were discovered in the following years, the mechanisms remained largely unknown.

The discovery of nerve growth factor by Rita Levi-Montalcini in 1954, and epidermal growth factor by Stanley Cohen in 1962, led to more detailed insights into the molecular basis of cell signaling, in particular growth factors. Their work, together with Earl Wilbur Sutherland's discovery of cyclic AMP in 1956, prompted the redefinition of endocrine signaling to include only signaling from glands, while the terms autocrine and paracrine began to be used. Sutherland was awarded the 1971 Nobel Prize in Physiology or Medicine, while Levi-Montalcini and Cohen shared it in 1986.

In 1970, Martin Rodbell examined the effects of glucagon on a rat's liver cell membrane receptor. He noted that GTP disassociated glucagon from this receptor and stimulated the G-protein, which strongly influenced the cell's metabolism. Thus, he deduced that the G-protein is a transducer that accepts glucagon molecules and affects the cell. For this, he shared the 1994 Nobel Prize in Physiology or Medicine with Alfred G. Gilman. Thus, the characterization of RTKs and GPCRs led to the formulation of the concept of "signal transduction", a word first used in 1972. Some early articles used the terms signal transmission and sensory transduction. In 2007, a total of 48,377 scientific papers—including 11,211 review papers—were published on the subject. The term first appeared in a paper's title in 1979. Widespread use of the term has been traced to a 1980 review article by Rodbell: Research papers focusing on signal transduction first appeared in large numbers in the late 1980s and early 1990s.

=== Signal transduction in immunology ===
The purpose of this section is to briefly describe some developments in immunology in the 1960s and 1970s, relevant to the initial stages of transmembrane signal transduction, and how they impacted our understanding of immunology, and ultimately of other areas of cell biology.

The relevant events begin with the sequencing of myeloma protein light chains, which are found in abundance in the urine of individuals with multiple myeloma. Biochemical experiments revealed that these so-called Bence Jones proteins consisted of 2 discrete domains –one that varied from one molecule to the next (the V domain) and one that did not (the Fc domain or the Fragment crystallizable region). An analysis of multiple V region sequences by Wu and Kabat identified locations within the V region that were hypervariable and which, they hypothesized, combined in the folded protein to form the antigen recognition site. Thus, within a relatively short time a plausible model was developed for the molecular basis of immunological specificity, and for mediation of biological function through the Fc domain. Crystallization of an IgG molecule soon followed ) confirming the inferences based on sequencing, and providing an understanding of immunological specificity at the highest level of resolution.

The biological significance of these developments was encapsulated in the theory of clonal selection which holds that a B cell has on its surface immunoglobulin receptors whose antigen-binding site is identical to that of antibodies that are secreted by the cell when it encounters an antigen, and more specifically a particular B cell clone secretes antibodies with identical sequences. The final piece of the story, the Fluid mosaic model of the plasma membrane provided all the ingredients for a new model for the initiation of signal transduction; viz, receptor dimerization.

The first hints of this were obtained by Becker et al who demonstrated that the extent to which human basophils—for which bivalent Immunoglobulin E (IgE) functions as a surface receptor – degranulate, depends on the concentration of anti IgE antibodies to which they are exposed, and results in a redistribution of surface molecules, which is absent when monovalent ligand is used. The latter observation was consistent with earlier findings by Fanger et al. These observations tied a biological response to events and structural details of molecules on the cell surface. A preponderance of evidence soon developed that receptor dimerization initiates responses (reviewed in) in a variety of cell types, including B cells.

Such observations led to a number of theoretical (mathematical) developments. The first of these was a simple model proposed by Bell which resolved an apparent paradox: clustering forms stable networks; i.e. binding is essentially irreversible, whereas the affinities of antibodies secreted by B cells increase as the immune response progresses. A theory of the dynamics of cell surface clustering on lymphocyte membranes was developed by DeLisi and Perelson who found the size distribution of clusters as a function of time, and its dependence on the affinity and valence of the ligand. Subsequent theories for basophils and mast cells were developed by Goldstein and Sobotka and their collaborators, all aimed at the analysis of dose-response patterns of immune cells and their biological correlates. For a recent review of clustering in immunological systems see.

Ligand binding to cell surface receptors is also critical to motility, a phenomenon that is best understood in single-celled organisms. An example is a detection and response to concentration gradients by bacteria -–the classic mathematical theory appearing in. A recent account can be found in

== See also ==
- Adaptor protein
- Scaffold protein
- Biosemiotics
- Cell signaling
- Gene regulatory network
- Hormonal imprinting
- Metabolic pathway
- Protein–protein interaction
- Two-component regulatory system
