= G protein-coupled receptors database =

GPCRDB
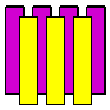

Content
- Description: G protein-coupled receptor data, web tools & diagrams
- Data types captured: Structures, mutants, sequences

Contact
- Research center: University of Copenhagen
- Authors: Vignir Isberg, Bas Vrolin, Gert Vriend, David Gloriam and others.
- Primary citation: Pandy-Szekeres G, Munk C, Tsonkov TM, Mordalski S, Harpsoe K, Hauser AS, Bojarski AJ, Gloriam DE.
- Release date: 1993

Access
- Website: https://www.gpcrdb.org
- Web service URL: https://gpcrdb.org/services/

Miscellaneous
- Curation policy: Manual and experimental data-derived

The GPCRdb database is the main repository of curated data for G protein-coupled receptors (GPCRs). It integrates various web tools and diagrams for GPCR analysis and stores manual annotations of all GPCR crystal structures made available through the PDB (Protein Data Bank), has the largest collections of receptor mutants and reference sequence alignments. A series of tools made available in the homepage for the GPCRdb can be run in the web browser to analyze structures, sequence similarities, receptor relationships, homology models, drug trends, genetic variants and ligand target profiles. Diagrams illustrate receptor sequences (using snake-plots and helix box diagrams) and relationships (phylogenetic trees).

== Background and development ==
According to Gert Vriend, one of the creators of the GPCRdb, the resource began in the following way:

"The GPCRdb was started in the early 90’s when Bob Bywater, Ad IJzerman, Friedrich Rippmann, and Gert Vriend organized a series of small GPCR workshops at the EMBL. Before the introduction of the first browsers, the GPCRdb worked as an automatic Email answering system that could send sequences, alignments, and homology models to the users. In 1994 the internet was firmly established in its present form, and money was obtained from the fourth EU framework to set up the GPCRdb. Florence Horn joined us to do this project. When she left us at the end of a four-year post-doc period the GPCRdb was firmly established as the prime source of information for GPCR data."

Over two decades, the GPCRdb evolved to be a comprehensive information system storing and analyzing data. In 2013, the stewardship of the GPCRdb was transferred to David Gloriam's group at the University of Copenhagen, backed up by an international team of contributors and developers from a EU COST Action called ‘GLISTEN’. The GPCRdb offers reference data and easy-to-use web tools and diagrams for a multidisciplinary audience investigating GPCR function, drug design or evolution and is actively involved in the European Research Network on Signal Transduction (‘ERNEST’).

== Content and features ==
A visual overview of the main features of the GPCRdb can be glimpsed at gpcrdb.org.

The GPCRdb browsing system is structured on most relevant categories which are:

- GPCRdb
- Receptors
- G Proteins
- B-Arrestins
- Biased Signaling
- Ligands
- Drugs
- Structure Constructs
- Tutorials, workshops and documentation of use.

Under the categories one can find subsections for specialized data and tools.

== Future directions ==
As part of two orphan GPCR projects funded by the European Research Commission and the Lundbeck Foundation, respectively, the GPCRdb will deposit data and develop computational tools for identification of endogenous and surrogate GPCR ligands. The GPCRdb aims to grow from and enable new progress in GPCR structure, function and ligand design. It crosslinks to the GuideToPharmacology database and has adopted the official NC-IUPHAR receptor naming nomenclature, has exchange with GPCR servers, and has also recently become part of the GPCR Consortium set out to generate an unprecedented number of crystal structures. Academic and industrial groups are welcome and encouraged to contact the GPCRdb with suggestions for joint development or data deposition.

== See also ==
- G protein-coupled receptors
