= Homologous desensitization =

When a receptor decreases its response to an agonist at high concentration

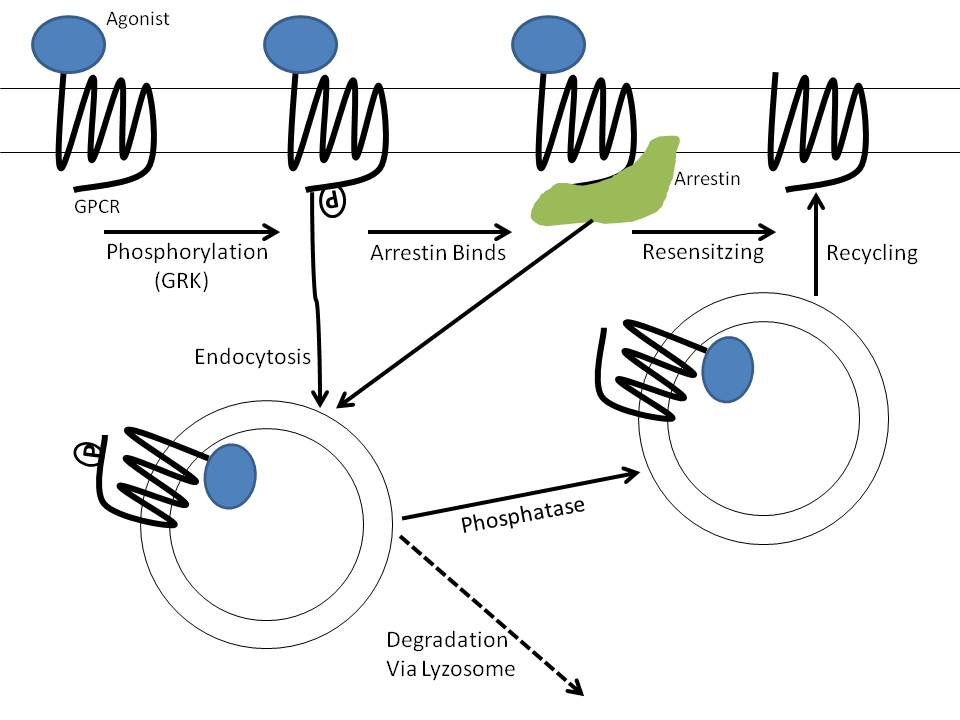
General pathways for GPCR homologous desensitization

Homologous desensitization occurs when a receptor decreases its response to an agonist at high concentration. It is a process through which, after prolonged agonist exposure, the receptor is uncoupled from its signaling cascade and thus the cellular effect of receptor activation is attenuated.

Homologous desensitization is distinguished from heterologous desensitization, a process in which repeated stimulation of a receptor by an agonist results in desensitization of the stimulated receptor as well as other, usually inactive, receptors on the same cell. They are sometimes denoted as agonist-dependent and agonist-independent desensitization respectively. While heterologous desensitization occurs rapidly at low agonist concentrations, homologous desensitization shows a dose dependent response and usually begins at significantly higher concentrations.

Homologous desensitization serves as a mechanism for tachyphylaxis and helps organisms to maintain homeostasis. The process of homologous desensitization has been extensively studied utilizing G protein–coupled receptors (GPCRs). While the different mechanisms for desensitization are still being characterized, there are currently four known mechanisms: uncoupling of receptors from associated G proteins, endocytosis, degradation, and downregulation. The degradation and downregulation of receptors is often also associated with drug tolerance since it has a longer onset, from hours to days. It has been shown that these mechanisms can happen independently of one another, but that they also influence one another. In addition, the same receptor expressed in different cell types can be desensitized by different mechanisms.

== Mechanisms ==
For GPCRs generally, each mechanism of homologous desensitization begins with receptor phosphorylation by an associated G protein-coupled receptor kinase (GRK). GRKs selectively modify activated receptors such that no heterogeneous desensitization will occur. This phosphorylation then acts to recruit other proteins, such as arrestins, that participate in one or more of the following mechanisms.

=== Receptor uncoupling ===
Receptor uncoupling/phosphorylation is the most rapid form of desensitization that happens within a cell, as its effects are seen within seconds to minutes of agonist application. The ß_{2} adrenergic receptor was the first to have its desensitization studied and characterized. The mechanism of desensitization involves the action of a specific GRK, denoted ßARK, and also ß-arrestins. The ß-arrestins show high affinity for receptors that are both phosphorylated and activated, but are still able to bind non-phosphorylated receptors with a lower affinity. Additionally, ß-arrestins are better at inactivating ßARK-phosphorylated receptors rather than protein kinase A-phosphorylated receptors, which suggests that the arrestins preferentially mediate homologous desensitization.

The mechanism of homologous desensitization for the β_{2} receptor is as follows:

1. Agonist binds and activates the receptor, which changes to an active conformational state.
2. Beta adrenergic receptor kinase (βARK), a cytoplasmic kinase is activated and phosphorylates the C-terminus of the β_{2} receptor.
3. This phosphorylation increases the affinity of β-arrestin for the receptor, resulting in uncoupling of the α subunit of the heterotrimeric G-protein from the receptor, producing desensitization.

=== Endocytosis ===
In contrast to receptor uncoupling, endocytosis can occur through multiple pathways. GPCR endocytosis has been shown to be either dependent or independent of arrestin activity, depending on the cell type used in the experiment; however, the former is more common. Furthermore, the same receptor expressed in two distinct cell types can be endocytosed through different mechanisms due to differences in GRK and arrestin expression: either through clathrin-coated vesicles or caveolae. In general, receptor sequestration preferentially affects receptors that are both activated and phosphorylated, but the phosphorylation is not always a necessary component of endocytosis. After being sequestered, the affected receptors can either be degraded by lysosomes or reinserted into the plasma membrane, which is called receptor recycling.

Post-translational modification also affects receptor endocytosis. For example, different glycosylations on the exterior N-terminus of dopamine receptors D_{2} and D_{3} were associated with specific endocytotic pathways. Additionally, palmitoylation, which primarily mediates receptor localization within the membrane, can also affect endocytosis. It is required for the endocytosis of thyrotropin-releasing hormone and D_{3} receptors, and it is inhibitory for leutinizing hormone and vasopressin receptor 1A receptors. It has been shown to have no effect on adrenergic receptors (specifically ß_{2} and α_{1}).
