= Mir-625 microRNA precursor family =

mir-625

Identifiers
- Symbol: mir-625
- Rfam: RF01017
- miRBase family: MIPF0000534

Other data
- RNA type: microRNA
- Domain: Eukaryota;
- PDB structures: PDBe

In molecular biology mir-625 microRNA is a short RNA molecule. MicroRNAs function to regulate the expression levels of other genes by several mechanisms. Many microRNAs play important roles in cancer development and progression.

== mir-625 and gastric cancer ==
mir-625 has been shown to be down regulated in gastric cancers. This is important, as mir-625 is responsible for the regulation of metastasis in gastric tumour cells, and therefore downregulation of mir-625 results in increased metastasis. mir-625 is thought to act by inhibiting the ILK protein.
