= ILKAP =

Protein-coding gene in the species Homo sapiens

Identifiers
- Aliases: ILKAP, ILKAP2, ILKAP3, PP2C-DELTA, PPM1O, ILK associated serine/threonine phosphatase, PP2CD
- External IDs: MGI: 1914694; GeneCards: ILKAP
Enzyme activity
EC #	BRENDA	ExPASy	KEGG	MetaCyc
3.1.3.16	↗	↗	↗	↗

Gene location (Human)
Chr.	Chromosome 2 (human)
Band	2q37.3	Start	238,170,402 bp
Band	2q37.3	End	238,203,708 bp

Gene location (Mouse)
Chr.	Chromosome 1 (mouse)
Band	1|1 D	Start	91,373,861 bp
Band	1|1 D	End	91,398,815 bp
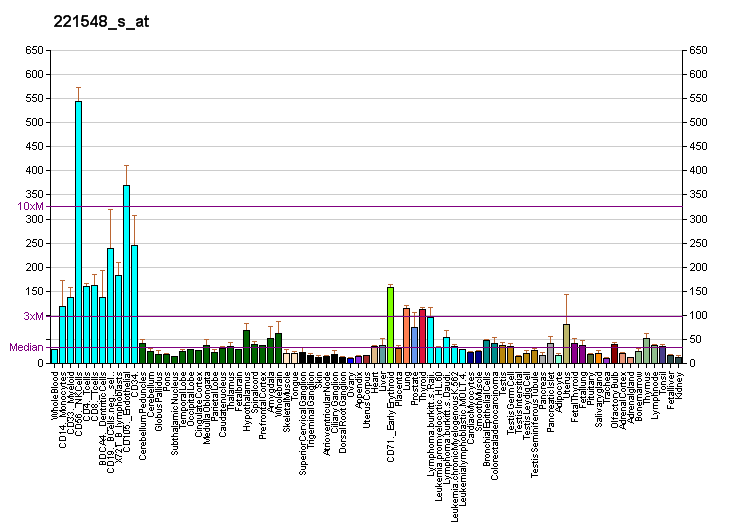
RNA expression pattern
Bgee	Human / Mouse (ortholog); Top expressed in: cerebellar hemisphere; right hemisphere of cerebellum; granulocyte; gastric mucosa; muscle layer of sigmoid colon; anterior pituitary; body of uterus; right lobe of thyroid gland; left lobe of thyroid gland; tibial nerve / Top expressed in: neural layer of retina; ventricular zone; neural tube; granulocyte; epiblast; thymus; muscle of thigh; right kidney; lip; embryo; More reference expression data
BioGPS	More reference expression data
Gene ontology
Molecular function	protein serine/threonine phosphatase activity; protein binding; catalytic activity; phosphoprotein phosphatase activity; hydrolase activity; metal ion binding; cation binding
Cellular component	cytoplasm; nucleus; nucleoplasm; cytosol
Biological process	protein dephosphorylation
Sources:Amigo / QuickGO
Orthologs
Databases	NCBI: entry; OMA: entry
Species	Human	Mouse
Entrez	80895	67444
Ensembl	ENSG00000132323	ENSMUSG00000026309
UniProt	Q9H0C8	Q8R0F6
RefSeq (mRNA)	NM_030768; NM_176799	NM_023343; NM_001355152
RefSeq (protein)	NP_110395	NP_075832; NP_001342081
Location (UCSC)	Chr 2: 238.17 – 238.2 Mb	Chr 1: 91.37 – 91.4 Mb
PubMed search
- Wikidata
View/Edit Human	View/Edit Mouse

Integrin-linked kinase-associated serine/threonine phosphatase 2C is an enzyme that in humans is encoded by the ILKAP gene.

The protein encoded by this gene is a protein serine/threonine phosphatase of the PP2C family. This protein can interact with integrin-linked kinase (ILK/ILK1), a regulator of integrin mediated signaling, and regulate the kinase activity of ILK. Through the interaction with ILK, this protein may selectively affect the signaling process of ILK-mediated glycogen synthase kinase 3 beta (GSK3beta), and thus participate in Wnt signaling pathway.

== Interactions ==
ILKAP has been shown to interact with Integrin-linked kinase.
