= G protein-coupled receptor =

Class of cell surface receptors coupled to G-protein-associated intracellular signaling

GPCR
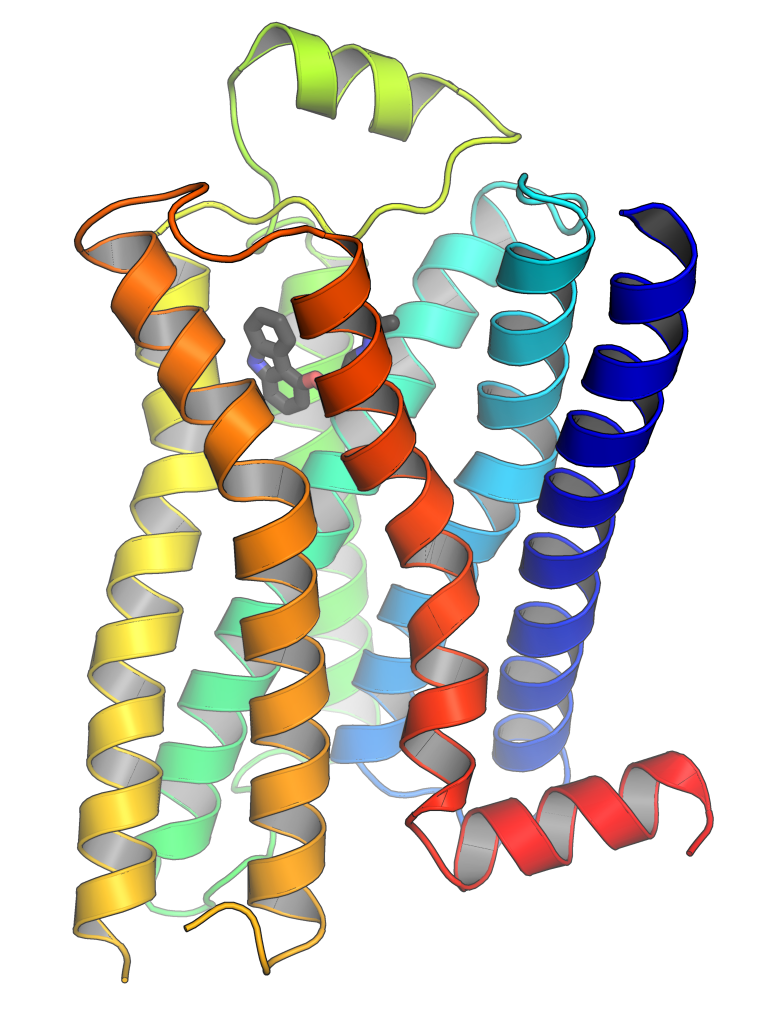
- The human beta-2 adrenergic receptor in complex with the partial inverse agonist carazolol

Identifiers
- Symbol: 7tm_1
- Pfam: PF00001
- Pfam clan: CL0192
- ECOD: 5001.1.1
- InterPro: IPR000276
- PROSITE: PDOC00210
- TCDB: 9.A.14
- OPM superfamily: 6
- OPM protein: 1gzm
- CDD: cd14964
Available protein structures:
- PDB: IPR000276 PF00001 (ECOD; PDBsum)
- AlphaFold: IPR000276; PF00001

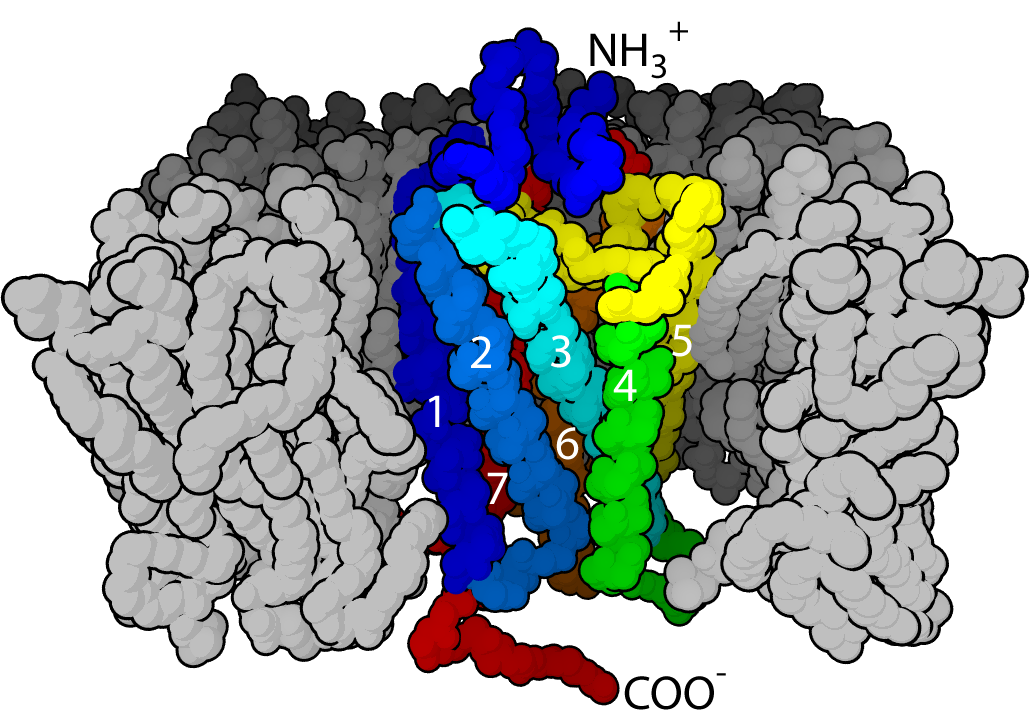
The seven-transmembrane α-helix structure of bovine rhodopsin

G protein-coupled receptors (GPCRs) (Note: also known as seven-(pass)-transmembrane domain receptors, 7TM receptors, heptahelical receptors, serpentine receptors, and G protein-linked receptors (GPLR)) form a large group of evolutionarily related proteins that are cell surface receptors that detect molecules outside the cell and activate cellular responses. They are coupled with G proteins. They pass through the cell membrane seven times in the form of six loops (three extracellular loops interacting with ligand molecules, three intracellular loops interacting with G proteins, an N-terminal extracellular region and a C-terminal intracellular region) of amino acid residues, which is why they are sometimes referred to as seven-transmembrane receptors. Ligands can bind either to the extracellular N-terminus and loops (e.g. glutamate receptors) or to the binding site within transmembrane helices (rhodopsin-like family). They are all activated by agonists, although a spontaneous auto-activation of an empty receptor has also been observed.

G protein-coupled receptors are found only in eukaryotes, including yeast, and choanoflagellates. The ligands that bind and activate these receptors include light-sensitive compounds, odors, pheromones, hormones, and neurotransmitters. They vary in size from small molecules to peptides, to small proteins. G protein-coupled receptors are involved in many diseases.

There are two principal signal transduction pathways involving the G protein-coupled receptors:

- the cAMP signal pathway and
- the phosphatidylinositol signal pathway.

When a ligand binds to the GPCR it causes a conformational change in the GPCR, which allows it to act as a guanine nucleotide exchange factor (GEF). The GPCR can then activate an associated G protein by exchanging the GDP bound to the G protein for a GTP. The G protein's α subunit, together with the bound GTP, can then dissociate from the β and γ subunits to further affect intracellular signaling proteins or target functional proteins directly depending on the α subunit type (G_{αs}, G_{αi/o}, G_{αq/11}, G_{α12/13}).

GPCRs are an important drug target, and approximately 34% of all Food and Drug Administration (FDA) approved drugs target 108 members of this family. The global sales volume for these drugs is estimated to be 180 billion US dollars as of 2018. It is estimated that GPCRs are targets for about 50% of drugs currently on the market, mainly due to their involvement in signaling pathways related to many diseases i.e. mental, metabolic including endocrinological disorders, immunological including viral infections, cardiovascular, inflammatory, senses disorders, and cancer. The long ago discovered association between GPCRs and many endogenous and exogenous substances, resulting in e.g. analgesia, is another dynamically developing field of the pharmaceutical research.

== History and significance ==
With the determination of the first structure of the complex between a G-protein coupled receptor (GPCR) and a G-protein trimer (Gαβγ) in 2011 a new chapter of GPCR research was opened for structural investigations of global switches with more than one protein being investigated. The previous breakthroughs involved determination of the crystal structure of the first GPCR, rhodopsin, in 2000 and the crystal structure of the first GPCR with a diffusible ligand (β_{2}AR) in 2007. The way in which the seven transmembrane helices of a GPCR are arranged into a bundle was suspected based on the low-resolution model of frog rhodopsin from cryogenic electron microscopy studies of the two-dimensional crystals. The crystal structure of rhodopsin, that came up three years later, was not a surprise apart from the presence of an additional cytoplasmic helix H8 and a precise location of a loop covering retinal binding site. However, it provided a scaffold which was hoped to be a universal template for homology modeling and drug design for other GPCRs – a notion that proved to be too optimistic.

Results 7 years later were surprising because the crystallization of β_{2}-adrenergic receptor (β_{2}AR) with a diffusible ligand revealed quite a different shape of the receptor extracellular side than that of rhodopsin. This area is important because it is responsible for the ligand binding and is targeted by many drugs. Moreover, the ligand binding site was much more spacious than in the rhodopsin structure and was open to the exterior. In the other receptors crystallized shortly afterwards the binding side was even more easily accessible to the ligand. New structures complemented with biochemical investigations uncovered mechanisms of action of molecular switches which modulate the structure of the receptor leading to activation states for agonists or to complete or partial inactivation states for inverse agonists.

The 2012 Nobel Prize in Chemistry was awarded to Brian Kobilka and Robert Lefkowitz for their work that was "crucial for understanding how G protein-coupled receptors function". There have been at least seven other Nobel Prizes awarded for some aspect of G protein–mediated signaling. As of 2012, two of the top ten global best-selling drugs (Advair Diskus and Abilify) act by targeting G protein-coupled receptors.

== Classification ==
Classification Scheme of GPCRs in 2006. Since this time, more genes have been found. Class A (Rhodopsin-like), Class B (Secretin-like), Class C (Glutamate Receptor-like), Others (Adhesion (33), Frizzled (11), Taste type-2 (25), unclassified (23)).

The exact size of the GPCR superfamily is unknown, but at least 831 different human genes (or about 4% of the entire protein-coding genome) have been predicted to code for them from genome sequence analysis. Although numerous classification schemes have been proposed, the superfamily was classically divided into three main classes (A, B, and C) with no detectable shared sequence homology between classes.

The largest class by far is class A, which accounts for nearly 85% of the GPCR genes. Of class A GPCRs, over half of these are predicted to encode olfactory receptors, while the remaining receptors are liganded by known endogenous compounds or are classified as orphan receptors. Despite the lack of sequence homology between classes, all GPCRs have a common structure and mechanism of signal transduction. The very large rhodopsin A group has been further subdivided into 19 subgroups (A1-A19).

According to the classical A-F system, GPCRs can be grouped into six classes based on sequence homology and functional similarity:

- Class A (or 1) (Rhodopsin-like)
- Class B (or 2) (Secretin receptor family)
- Class C (or 3) (Metabotropic glutamate/pheromone)
- Class D (or 4) (Fungal mating pheromone receptors)
- Class E (or 5) (Cyclic AMP receptors)
- Class F (or 6) (Frizzled/Smoothened)

More recently, an alternative classification system called GRAFS (Glutamate, Rhodopsin, Adhesion, Frizzled/Taste2, Secretin) has been proposed for vertebrate GPCRs. They correspond to classical classes C, A, B2, F, and B.

An early study based on available DNA sequence suggested that the human genome encodes roughly 750 G protein-coupled receptors, about 350 of which detect hormones, growth factors, and other endogenous ligands. Approximately 150 of the GPCRs found in the human genome have unknown functions.

Some web-servers and bioinformatics prediction methods have been used for predicting the classification of GPCRs according to their amino acid sequence alone, by means of the pseudo amino acid composition approach.

== Physiological roles ==
GPCRs are involved in a wide variety of physiological processes. Some examples of their physiological roles include:

1. The visual sense: The opsins use a photoisomerization reaction to translate electromagnetic radiation into cellular signals. Rhodopsin, for example, uses the conversion of 11-cis-retinal to all-trans-retinal for this purpose.
2. The gustatory sense (taste): GPCRs in taste cells mediate release of gustducin in response to bitter-, umami- and sweet-tasting substances.
3. The sense of smell: Receptors of the olfactory epithelium bind odorants (olfactory receptors) and pheromones (vomeronasal receptors)
4. Behavioral and mood regulation: G protein-coupled receptors in the mammalian brain bind several different neurotransmitters, including serotonin, dopamine, histamine, noradrenaline, and GABA. Notable exceptions include GABA_{A} receptor, 5-HT_{3} serotonin receptor and glutamate receptors (NMDAR, AMPAR and kainate receptor), which are ion channels.
5. Regulation of immune system activity and inflammation: chemokine receptors bind ligands that mediate intercellular communication between cells of the immune system; receptors such as histamine receptors bind inflammatory mediators and engage target cell types in the inflammatory response. GPCRs are also involved in immune-modulation, e. g. regulating interleukin induction or suppressing TLR-induced immune responses from T cells.
6. Autonomic nervous system transmission: Both the sympathetic and parasympathetic nervous systems are regulated by GPCR pathways. The involved receptors include adrenergic receptors (α_{1}, α_{2}, β_{1}, β_{2} and β_{3}, of which β_{2} is notable for being the first GPCR to have the crystal structure determined) for the sympathetic nervous system and muscarinic acetylcholine receptors for the parasympathetic nervous system. Adrenergic receptor ligands are known to modulate blood pressure and heart rate, while muscarinic antagonists produce a host of symptoms such as pupil dilation, urinary retention, constipation and dry mouth that are directly related to inhibition of the parasympathetic nervous system.
7. Cell density sensing: A novel GPCR role in regulating cell density sensing.
8. Homeostasis modulation (e.g., water balance).
9. Involved in growth and metastasis of some types of tumors.
10. Used in the endocrine system for peptide and amino-acid derivative hormones that bind to GCPRs on the cell membrane of a target cell. This activates cAMP, which in turn activates several kinases, allowing for a cellular response, such as transcription.

== Receptor structure ==
GPCRs are integral membrane proteins that possess seven membrane-spanning domains or transmembrane helices. The extracellular parts of the receptor can be glycosylated. These extracellular loops also contain two highly conserved cysteine residues that form disulfide bonds to stabilize the receptor structure. Some seven-transmembrane helix proteins (channelrhodopsin) that resemble GPCRs may contain ion channels, within their protein.

In 2000, the first crystal structure of a mammalian GPCR, that of bovine rhodopsin (1F88), was solved. In 2007, the first structure of a human GPCR was solved This human β_{2}-adrenergic receptor GPCR structure proved highly similar to the bovine rhodopsin. The structures of activated or agonist-bound GPCRs have also been determined. These structures indicate how ligand binding at the extracellular side of a receptor leads to conformational changes in the cytoplasmic side of the receptor. The biggest change is an outward movement of the cytoplasmic part of the 5th and 6th transmembrane helix (TM5 and TM6). The structure of activated beta-2 adrenergic receptor in complex with G_{s} confirmed that the Gα binds to a cavity created by this movement.

GPCRs exhibit a similar structure to some other proteins with seven transmembrane domains, such as microbial rhodopsins and adiponectin receptors 1 and 2 (ADIPOR1 and ADIPOR2). However, these 7TMH (7-transmembrane helices) receptors and channels do not associate with G proteins. In addition, ADIPOR1 and ADIPOR2 are oriented oppositely to GPCRs in the membrane (i.e. GPCRs usually have an extracellular N-terminus, cytoplasmic C-terminus, whereas ADIPORs are inverted).

== Structure–function relationships ==
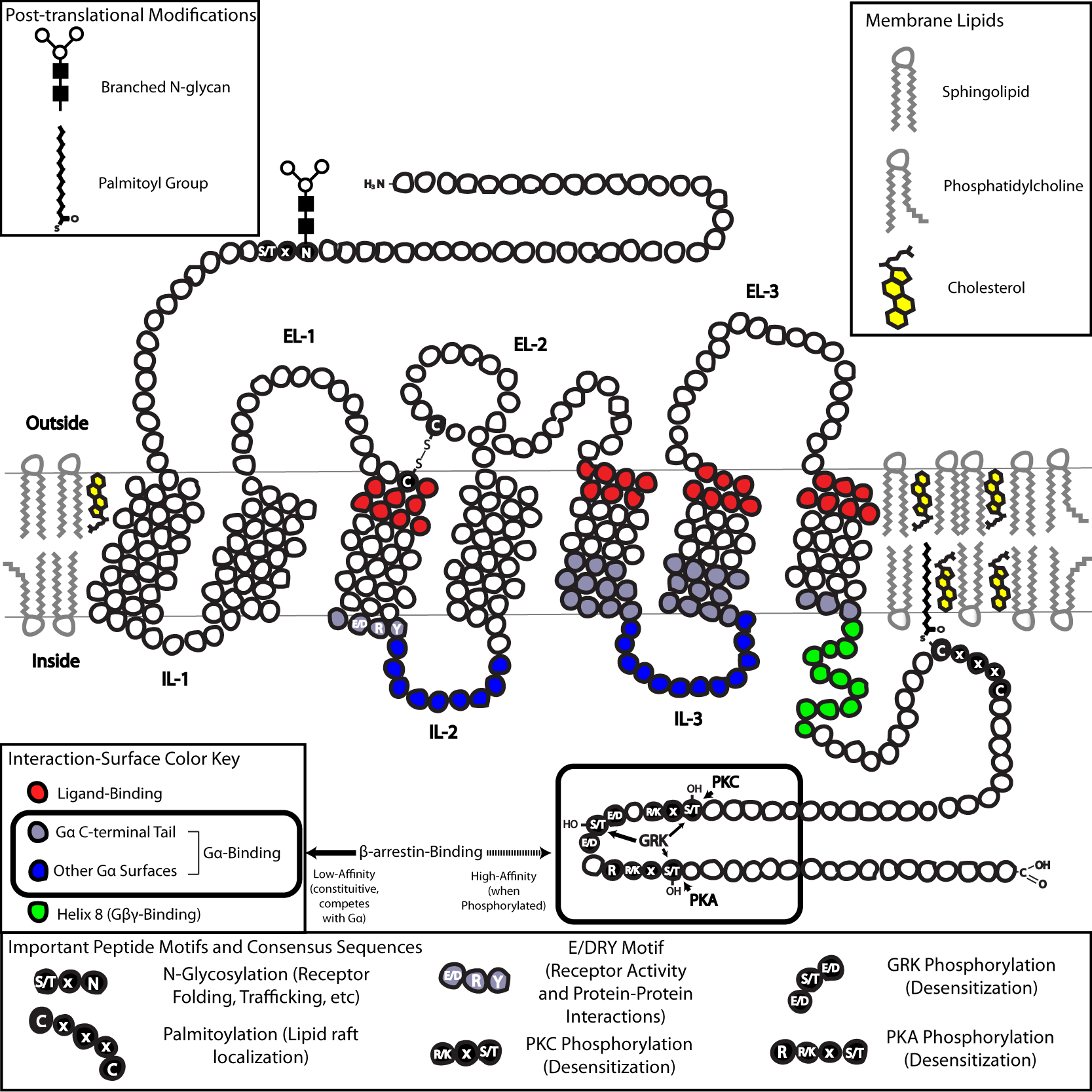
Two-dimensional schematic of a generic GPCR set in a lipid raft. Click the image for higher resolution to see details regarding the locations of important structures.

In terms of structure, GPCRs are characterized by an extracellular N-terminus, followed by seven transmembrane (7-TM) α-helices (TM-1 to TM-7) connected by three intracellular (IL-1 to IL-3) and three extracellular loops (EL-1 to EL-3), and finally an intracellular C-terminus. The GPCR arranges itself into a tertiary structure resembling a barrel, with the seven transmembrane helices forming a cavity within the plasma membrane that serves a ligand-binding domain that is often covered by EL-2. Ligands may also bind elsewhere, however, as is the case for bulkier ligands (e.g., proteins or large peptides), which instead interact with the extracellular loops, or, as illustrated by the class C metabotropic glutamate receptors (mGluRs), the N-terminal tail. The class C GPCRs are distinguished by their large N-terminal tail, which also contains a ligand-binding domain. Upon glutamate-binding to an mGluR, the N-terminal tail undergoes a conformational change that leads to its interaction with the residues of the extracellular loops and TM domains. The eventual effect of all three types of agonist-induced activation is a change in the relative orientations of the TM helices (likened to a twisting motion) leading to a wider intracellular surface and "revelation" of residues of the intracellular helices and TM domains crucial to signal transduction function (i.e., G-protein coupling). Inverse agonists and antagonists may also bind to a number of different sites, but the eventual effect must be prevention of this TM helix reorientation.

The structure of the N- and C-terminal tails of GPCRs may also serve important functions beyond ligand-binding. For example, The C-terminus of M_{3} muscarinic receptors is sufficient, and the six-amino-acid polybasic (KKKRRK) domain in the C-terminus is necessary for its preassembly with G_{q} proteins. In particular, the C-terminus often contains serine (Ser) or threonine (Thr) residues that, when phosphorylated, increase the affinity of the intracellular surface for the binding of scaffolding proteins called β-arrestins (β-arr). Once bound, β-arrestins both sterically prevent G-protein coupling and may recruit other proteins, leading to the creation of signaling complexes involved in extracellular-signal regulated kinase (ERK) pathway activation or receptor endocytosis (internalization). As the phosphorylation of these Ser and Thr residues often occurs as a result of GPCR activation, the β-arr-mediated G-protein-decoupling and internalization of GPCRs are important mechanisms of desensitization. In addition, internalized "mega-complexes" consisting of a single GPCR, β-arr(in the tail conformation), and heterotrimeric G protein exist and may account for protein signaling from endosomes.

A final common structural theme among GPCRs is palmitoylation of one or more sites of the C-terminal tail or the intracellular loops. Palmitoylation is the covalent modification of cysteine (Cys) residues via addition of hydrophobic acyl groups, and has the effect of targeting the receptor to cholesterol- and sphingolipid-rich microdomains of the plasma membrane called lipid rafts. As many of the downstream transducer and effector molecules of GPCRs (including those involved in negative feedback pathways) are also targeted to lipid rafts, this has the effect of facilitating rapid receptor signaling.

GPCRs respond to extracellular signals mediated by a huge diversity of agonists, ranging from proteins to biogenic amines to protons, but all transduce this signal via a mechanism of G-protein coupling. This is made possible by a guanine-nucleotide exchange factor (GEF) domain primarily formed by a combination of IL-2 and IL-3 along with adjacent residues of the associated TM helices.

== Mechanism ==
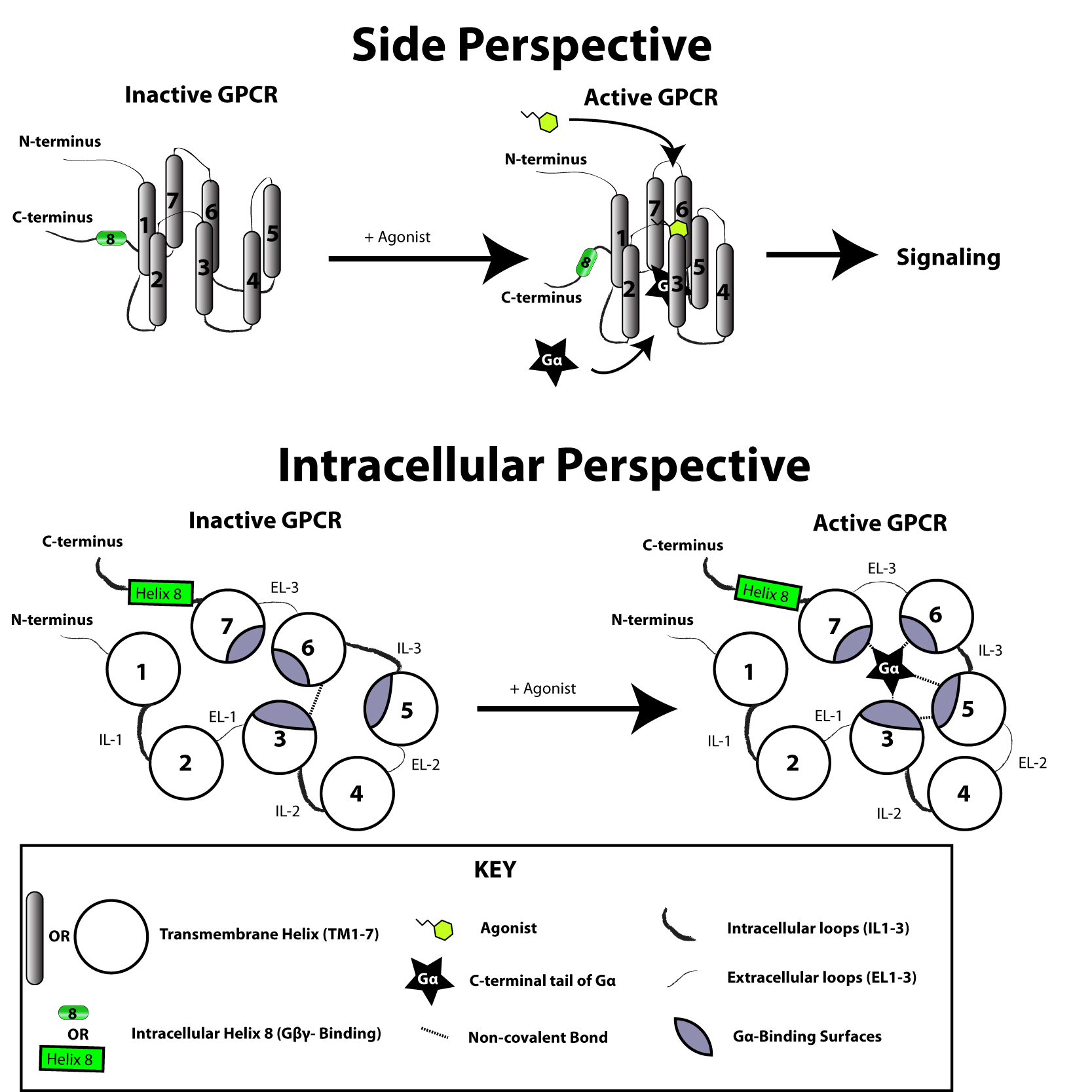
Cartoon depicting the basic concept of GPCR conformational activation. Ligand binding disrupts an ionic lock between the E/DRY motif of TM-3 and acidic residues of TM-6. As a result, the GPCR reorganizes to allow activation of G-alpha proteins. The "side perspective" is a view from above and to the side of the GPCR as it is set in the plasma membrane (the membrane lipids have been omitted for clarity). The incorrectly labelled "intracellular perspective" shows an extracellular view looking down at the plasma membrane from outside the cell.

The G protein-coupled receptor is activated by an external signal in the form of a ligand or other signal mediator. This creates a conformational change in the receptor, causing activation of a G protein. Further effect depends on the type of G protein. G proteins are subsequently inactivated by GTPase activating proteins, known as RGS proteins.

=== Ligand binding ===
GPCRs include one or more receptors for the following ligands: sensory signal mediators (e.g., light and olfactory stimulatory molecules); adenosine, bombesin, bradykinin, endothelin, γ-aminobutyric acid (GABA), hepatocyte growth factor (HGF), melanocortins, neuropeptide Y, opioid peptides, opsins, somatostatin, GH, tachykinins, members of the vasoactive intestinal peptide family, and vasopressin; biogenic amines (e.g., dopamine, epinephrine, norepinephrine, histamine, serotonin, and melatonin); glutamate (metabotropic effect); glucagon; acetylcholine (muscarinic effect); chemokines; lipid mediators of inflammation (e.g., prostaglandins, prostanoids, platelet-activating factor, and leukotrienes); peptide hormones (e.g., calcitonin, C5a anaphylatoxin, follicle-stimulating hormone [FSH], gonadotropin-releasing hormone [GnRH], neurokinin, thyrotropin-releasing hormone [TRH], and oxytocin); and endocannabinoids.

GPCRs that act as receptors for stimuli that have not yet been identified are known as orphan receptors.

However, in contrast to other types of receptors that have been studied, wherein ligands bind externally to the membrane, the ligands of GPCRs typically bind within the transmembrane domain. However, protease-activated receptors are activated by cleavage of part of their extracellular domain.

=== Conformational change ===
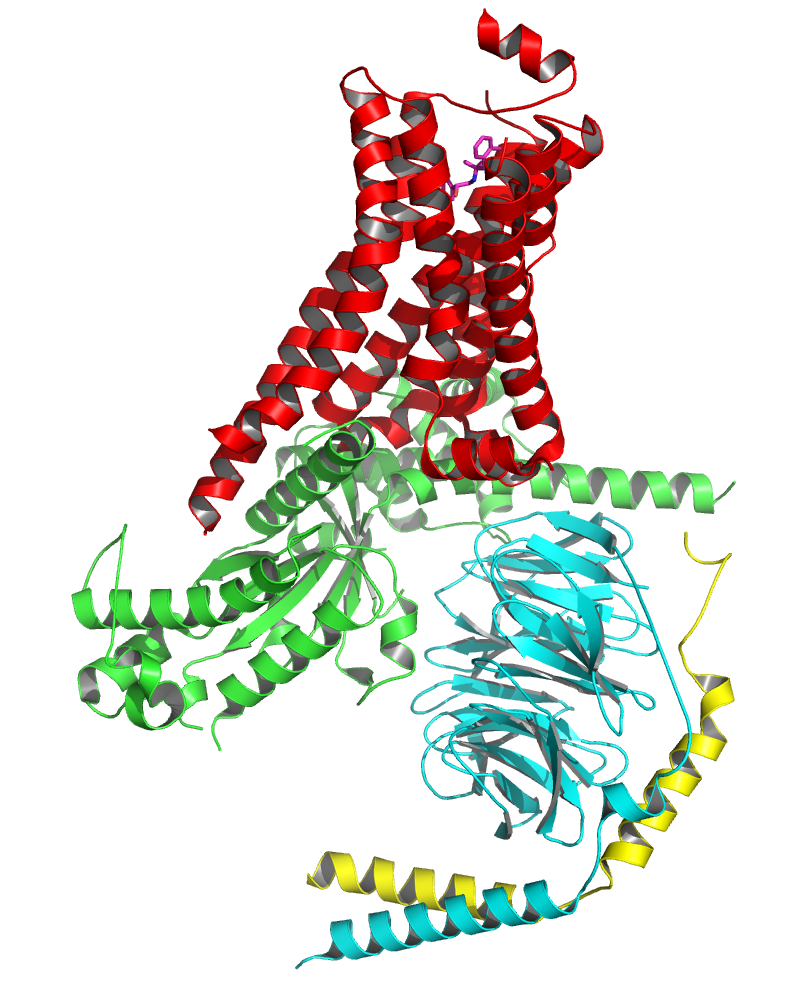
Crystal structure of activated beta-2 adrenergic receptor in complex with G_{s}(PDB entry 3SN6). The receptor is colored red, Gα green, Gβ cyan, and Gγ yellow. The C-terminus of Gα is located in a cavity created by an outward movement of the cytoplasmic parts of TM5 and 6.

The transduction of the signal through the membrane by the receptor is not completely understood. It is known that in the inactive state, the GPCR is bound to a heterotrimeric G protein complex. Binding of an agonist to the GPCR results in a conformational change in the receptor that is transmitted to the bound G_{α} subunit of the heterotrimeric G protein via protein domain dynamics. The activated G_{α} subunit exchanges GTP in place of GDP which in turn triggers the dissociation of G_{α} subunit from the G_{βγ} dimer and from the receptor. The dissociated G_{α} and G_{βγ} subunits interact with other intracellular proteins to continue the signal transduction cascade while the freed GPCR is able to rebind to another heterotrimeric G protein to form a new complex that is ready to initiate another round of signal transduction.

It is believed that a receptor molecule exists in a conformational equilibrium between active and inactive biophysical states. The binding of ligands to the receptor may shift the equilibrium toward the active receptor states. Three types of ligands exist: Agonists are ligands that shift the equilibrium in favour of active states; inverse agonists are ligands that shift the equilibrium in favour of inactive states; and neutral antagonists are ligands that do not affect the equilibrium. It is not yet known how exactly the active and inactive states differ from each other.

=== G-protein activation/deactivation cycle ===
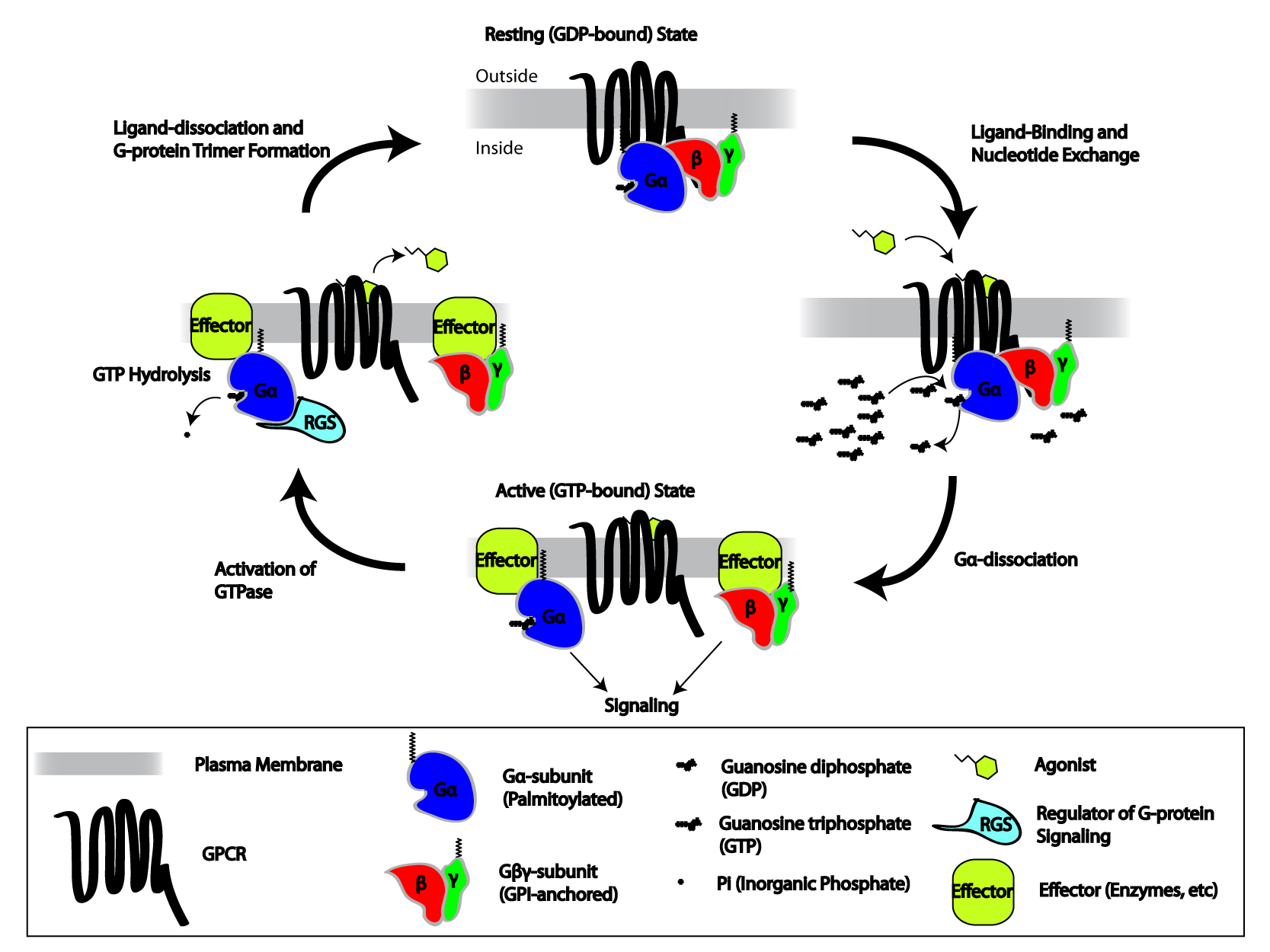
Cartoon depicting the heterotrimeric G-protein activation/deactivation cycle in the context of GPCR signaling

When the receptor is inactive, the GEF domain may be bound to an also inactive α-subunit of a heterotrimeric G-protein. These "G-proteins" are a trimer of α, β, and γ subunits (known as Gα, Gβ, and Gγ, respectively) that is rendered inactive when reversibly bound to Guanosine diphosphate (GDP) (or, alternatively, no guanine nucleotide) but active when bound to guanosine triphosphate (GTP). Upon receptor activation, the GEF domain, in turn, allosterically activates the G-protein by facilitating the exchange of a molecule of GDP for GTP at the G-protein's α-subunit. The cell maintains a 10:1 ratio of cytosolic GTP:GDP so exchange for GTP is ensured. At this point, the subunits of the G-protein dissociate from the receptor, as well as each other, to yield a Gα-GTP monomer and a tightly interacting Gβγ dimer, which are now free to modulate the activity of other intracellular proteins. The extent to which they may diffuse, however, is limited due to the palmitoylation of Gα and the presence of an isoprenoid moiety that has been covalently added to the C-termini of Gγ.

Because Gα also has slow GTP→GDP hydrolysis capability, the inactive form of the α-subunit (Gα-GDP) is eventually regenerated, thus allowing reassociation with a Gβγ dimer to form the "resting" G-protein, which can again bind to a GPCR and await activation. The rate of GTP hydrolysis is often accelerated due to the actions of another family of allosteric modulating proteins called regulators of G-protein signaling, or RGS proteins, which are a type of GTPase-activating protein, or GAP. In fact, many of the primary effector proteins (e.g., adenylate cyclases) that become activated/inactivated upon interaction with Gα-GTP also have GAP activity. Thus, even at this early stage in the process, GPCR-initiated signaling has the capacity for self-termination.

=== Crosstalk ===
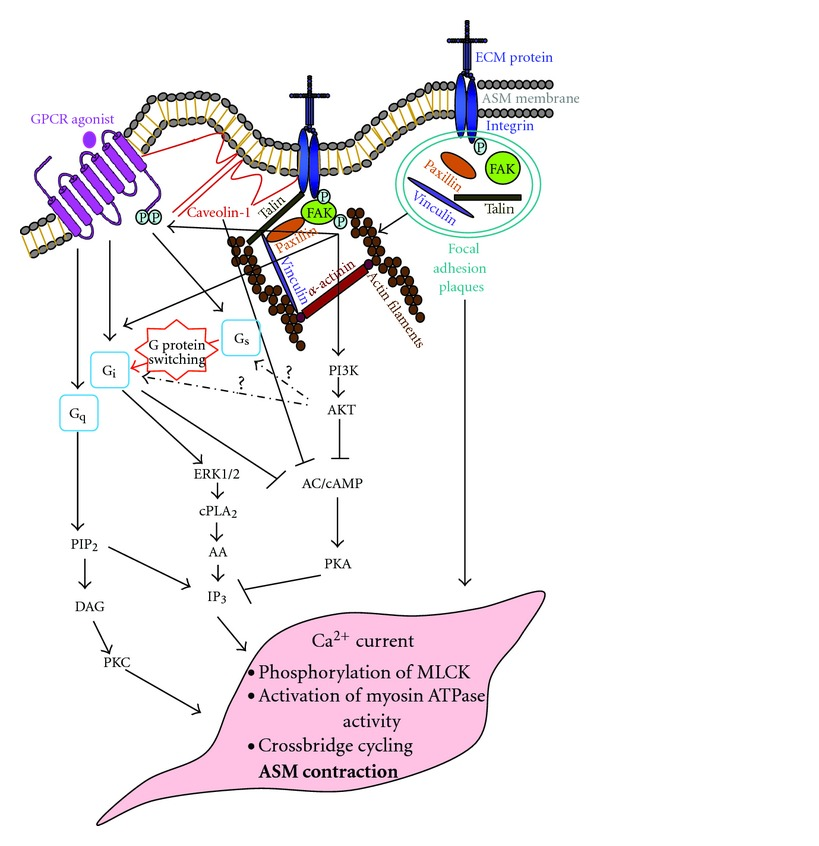
Proposed downstream interactions between integrin signaling and GPCRs. Integrins are shown elevating Ca^{2+} and phosphorylating FAK, which is weakening GPCR signaling.

GPCRs downstream signals have been shown to possibly interact with integrin signals, such as FAK. Integrin signaling will phosphorylate FAK, which can then decrease GPCR G_{αs} activity.

== Signaling ==
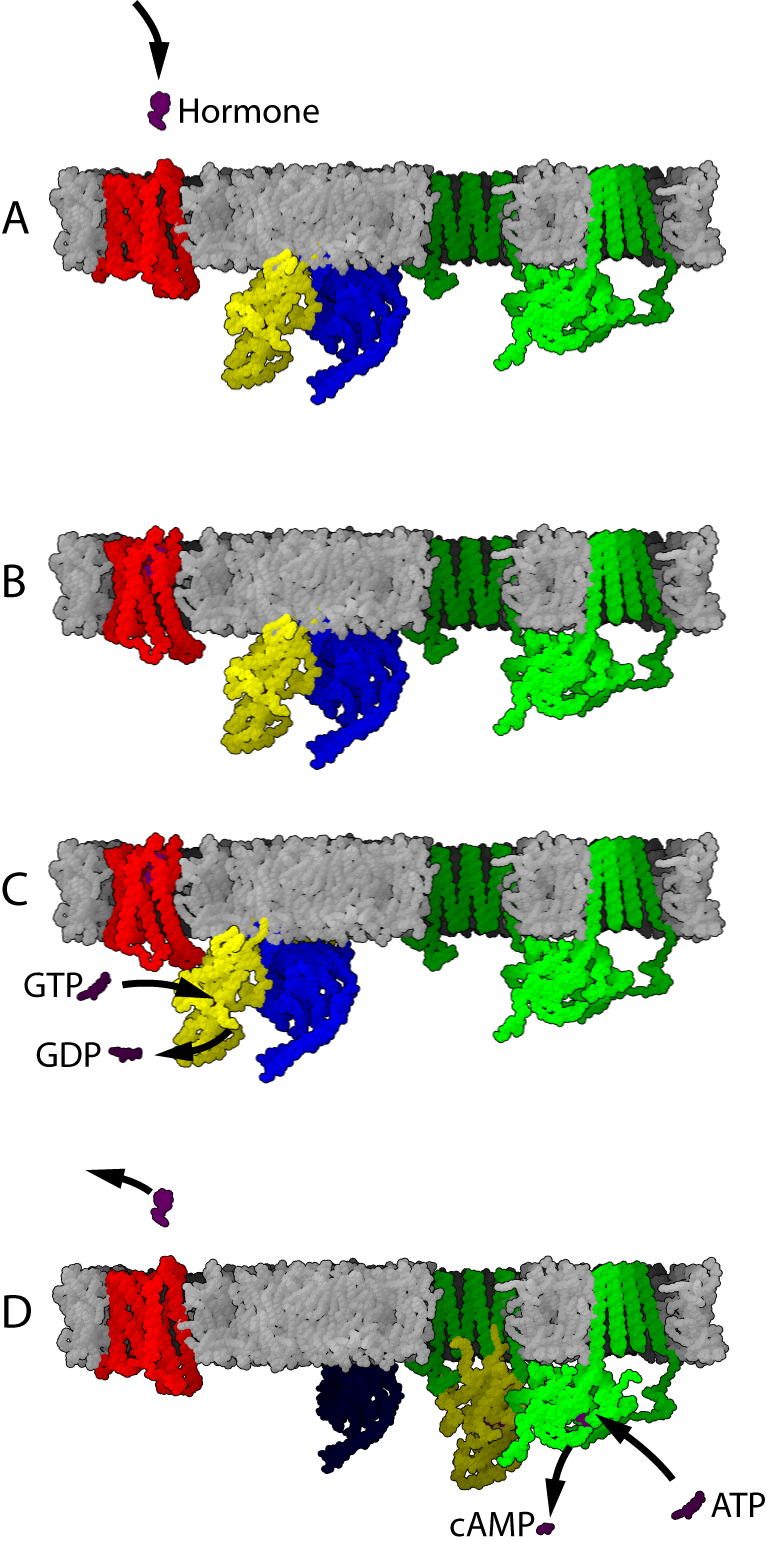
G-protein-coupled receptor mechanism

If a receptor in an active state encounters a G protein, it may activate it. Some evidence suggests that receptors and G proteins are actually pre-coupled. For example, binding of G proteins to receptors affects the receptor's affinity for ligands. Activated G proteins are bound to GTP.

Further signal transduction depends on the type of G protein. The enzyme adenylate cyclase is an example of a cellular protein that can be regulated by a G protein, in this case the G protein G_{s}. Adenylate cyclase activity is activated when it binds to a subunit of the activated G protein. Activation of adenylate cyclase ends when the G protein returns to the GDP-bound state.

Adenylate cyclases (of which 9 membrane-bound and one cytosolic forms are known in humans) may also be activated or inhibited in other ways (e.g., Ca2+/calmodulin binding), which can modify the activity of these enzymes in an additive or synergistic fashion along with the G proteins.

The signaling pathways activated through a GPCR are limited by the primary sequence and tertiary structure of the GPCR itself but ultimately determined by the particular conformation stabilized by a particular ligand, as well as the availability of transducer molecules. Currently, GPCRs are considered to utilize two primary types of transducers: G-proteins and β-arrestins. Because β-arr's have high affinity only to the phosphorylated form of most GPCRs (see above or below), the majority of signaling is ultimately dependent upon G-protein activation. However, the possibility for interaction does allow for G-protein-independent signaling to occur.

=== G-protein-dependent signaling ===
There are three main G-protein-mediated signaling pathways, mediated by four sub-classes of G_{α}-proteins distinguished from each other by sequence homology (G_{αs}, G_{αi/o}, G_{αq/11}, and G_{α12/13}). Each sub-class of G-protein consists of multiple proteins, each the product of multiple genes or splice variations that may imbue them with differences ranging from subtle to distinct with regard to signaling properties, but in general they appear reasonably grouped into four classes. Because the signal transducing properties of the various possible βγ combinations do not appear to radically differ from one another, these classes are defined according to the isoform of their α-subunit.

While most GPCRs are capable of activating more than one Gα-subtype, they also show a preference for one subtype over another. When the subtype activated depends on the ligand that is bound to the GPCR, this is called functional selectivity (also known as agonist-directed trafficking, or conformation-specific agonism). However, the binding of any single particular agonist may also initiate activation of multiple different G-proteins, as it may be capable of stabilizing more than one conformation of the GPCR's GEF domain, even over the course of a single interaction. In addition, a conformation that preferably activates one isoform of Gα may activate another if the preferred is less available. Furthermore, feedback pathways may result in receptor modifications (e.g., phosphorylation) that alter the G-protein preference. Regardless of these various nuances, the GPCR's preferred coupling partner is usually defined according to the G-protein most obviously activated by the endogenous ligand under most physiological or experimental conditions.

==== Gα signaling ====
1. The effector of both the G_{αs} and G_{αi/o} pathways is the cyclic-adenosine monophosphate (cAMP)-generating enzyme adenylate cyclase, or AC. While there are ten different AC gene products in mammals, each with subtle differences in tissue distribution or function, all catalyze the conversion of cytosolic adenosine triphosphate (ATP) to cAMP, and all are directly stimulated by G-proteins of the G_{αs} class. In contrast, however, interaction with Gα subunits of the G_{αi/o} type inhibits AC from generating cAMP. Thus, a GPCR coupled to G_{αs} counteracts the actions of a GPCR coupled to G_{αi/o}, and vice versa. The level of cytosolic cAMP may then determine the activity of various ion channels as well as members of the ser/thr-specific protein kinase A (PKA) family. Thus cAMP is considered a second messenger and PKA a secondary effector.
2. The effector of the G_{αq/11} pathway is phospholipase C-β (PLCβ), which catalyzes the cleavage of membrane-bound phosphatidylinositol 4,5-bisphosphate (PIP_{2}) into the second messengers inositol (1,4,5) trisphosphate (IP_{3}) and diacylglycerol (DAG). IP_{3} acts on IP_{3} receptors found in the membrane of the endoplasmic reticulum (ER) to elicit Ca^{2+} release from the ER, while DAG diffuses along the plasma membrane where it may activate any membrane localized forms of a second ser/thr kinase called protein kinase C (PKC). Since many isoforms of PKC are also activated by increases in intracellular Ca^{2+}, both these pathways can also converge on each other to signal through the same secondary effector. Elevated intracellular Ca^{2+} also binds and allosterically activates proteins called calmodulins, which in turn activate cytosolic small GTPase, Rho. Once bound to GTP, Rho can then go on to activate various proteins responsible for cytoskeleton regulation such as Rho-kinase (ROCK). Most GPCRs that couple to G_{α12/13} also couple to other sub-classes, often G_{αq/11}.

==== Gβγ signaling ====
The above descriptions ignore the effects of Gβγ–signalling, which can also be important, in particular in the case of activated G_{αi/o}-coupled GPCRs. The primary effectors of Gβγ are various ion channels, such as G-protein-regulated inwardly rectifying K^{+} channels (GIRKs), P/Q- and N-type voltage-gated Ca^{2+} channels, as well as some isoforms of AC and PLC, along with some phosphoinositide-3-kinase (PI3K) isoforms.

=== G-protein-independent signaling ===
Although they are classically thought of working only together, GPCRs may signal through G-protein-independent mechanisms, and heterotrimeric G-proteins may play functional roles independent of GPCRs. GPCRs may signal independently through many proteins already mentioned for their roles in G-protein-dependent signaling such as β-arrs, GRKs, and Srcs. Such signaling has been shown to be physiologically relevant, for example, β-arrestin signaling mediated by the chemokine receptor CXCR3 was necessary for full efficacy chemotaxis of activated T cells. In addition, further scaffolding proteins involved in subcellular localization of GPCRs (e.g., PDZ-domain-containing proteins) may also act as signal transducers. Most often the effector is a member of the MAPK family.

==== Examples ====
In the late 1990s, evidence began accumulating to suggest that some GPCRs are able to signal without G proteins. The ERK2 mitogen-activated protein kinase, a key signal transduction mediator downstream of receptor activation in many pathways, has been shown to be activated in response to cAMP-mediated receptor activation in the slime mold D. discoideum despite the absence of the associated G protein α- and β-subunits.

In mammalian cells, the much-studied β_{2}-adrenoceptor has been demonstrated to activate the ERK2 pathway after arrestin-mediated uncoupling of G-protein-mediated signaling. Therefore, it seems likely that some mechanisms previously believed related purely to receptor desensitisation are actually examples of receptors switching their signaling pathway, rather than simply being switched off.

In kidney cells, the bradykinin receptor B2 has been shown to interact directly with a protein tyrosine phosphatase. The presence of a tyrosine-phosphorylated ITIM (immunoreceptor tyrosine-based inhibitory motif) sequence in the B2 receptor is necessary to mediate this interaction and subsequently the antiproliferative effect of bradykinin.

==== Gpcr-independent signaling by heterotrimeric g-proteins ====
Although it is a relatively immature area of research, it appears that heterotrimeric G-proteins may also take part in non-GPCR signaling. There is evidence for roles as signal transducers in nearly all other types of receptor-mediated signaling, including integrins, receptor tyrosine kinases (RTKs), cytokine receptors (JAK/STATs), as well as modulation of various other "accessory" proteins such as GEFs, guanine-nucleotide dissociation inhibitors (GDIs) and protein phosphatases. There may even be specific proteins of these classes whose primary function is as part of GPCR-independent pathways, termed activators of G-protein signalling (AGS). Both the ubiquity of these interactions and the importance of Gα vs. Gβγ subunits to these processes are still unclear.

== Details of cAMP and pip_{2} pathways ==
Activation effects of cAMP on protein kinase A

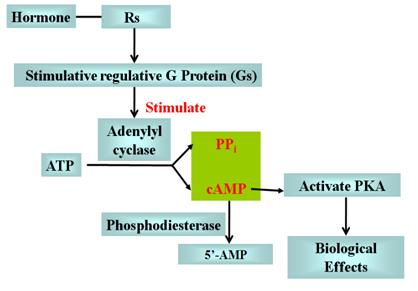
The effect of Rs and Gs in cAMP signal pathway

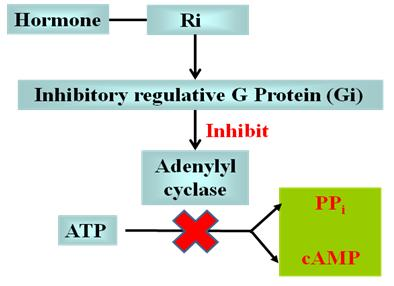
The effect of Ri and Gi in cAMP signal pathway

There are two principal signal transduction pathways involving the G protein-linked receptors: the cAMP signal pathway and the phosphatidylinositol signal pathway.

=== cAMP signal pathway ===
The cAMP signal transduction contains five main characters: stimulative hormone receptor (Rs) or inhibitory hormone receptor (Ri); stimulative regulative G-protein (Gs) or inhibitory regulative G-protein (Gi); adenylyl cyclase; protein kinase A (PKA); and cAMP phosphodiesterase.

Stimulative hormone receptor (Rs) is a receptor that can bind with stimulative signal molecules, while inhibitory hormone receptor (Ri) is a receptor that can bind with inhibitory signal molecules.

Stimulative regulative G-protein is a G-protein linked to stimulative hormone receptor (Rs), and its α subunit upon activation could stimulate the activity of an enzyme or other intracellular metabolism. On the contrary, inhibitory regulative G-protein is linked to an inhibitory hormone receptor, and its α subunit upon activation could inhibit the activity of an enzyme or other intracellular metabolism.

Adenylyl cyclase is a 12-transmembrane glycoprotein that catalyzes the conversion of ATP to cAMP with the help of cofactor Mg^{2+} or Mn^{2+}. The cAMP produced is a second messenger in cellular metabolism and is an allosteric activator of protein kinase A.

Protein kinase A is an important enzyme in cell metabolism due to its ability to regulate cell metabolism by phosphorylating specific committed enzymes in the metabolic pathway. It can also regulate specific gene expression, cellular secretion, and membrane permeability. The protein enzyme contains two catalytic subunits and two regulatory subunits. When there is no cAMP, the complex is inactive. When cAMP binds to the regulatory subunits, their conformation is altered, causing the dissociation of the regulatory subunits, which activates protein kinase A and allows further biological effects.

These signals then can be terminated by cAMP phosphodiesterase, which is an enzyme that degrades cAMP to 5'-AMP and inactivates protein kinase A.

=== Phosphatidylinositol signal pathway ===
In the phosphatidylinositol signal pathway, the extracellular signal molecule binds with the G-protein receptor (G_{q}) on the cell surface and activates phospholipase C, which is located on the plasma membrane. The lipase hydrolyzes PIP_{2} into two second messengers: inositol 1,4,5-trisphosphate (IP_{3}) and diacylglycerol (DAG). IP_{3} binds with the IP_{3} receptor in the membrane of the smooth endoplasmic reticulum and mitochondria to open Ca^{2+} channels. DAG helps activate protein kinase C (PKC), which phosphorylates many other proteins, changing their catalytic activities, leading to cellular responses.

The effects of Ca^{2+} are also remarkable: it cooperates with DAG in activating PKC and can activate the CaM kinase pathway, in which calcium-modulated protein calmodulin (CaM) binds Ca^{2+}, undergoes a change in conformation, and activates CaM kinase II, which has unique ability to increase its binding affinity to CaM by autophosphorylation, making CaM unavailable for the activation of other enzymes. The kinase then phosphorylates target enzymes, regulating their activities. The two signal pathways are connected together by Ca^{2+}-CaM, which is also a regulatory subunit of adenylyl cyclase and phosphodiesterase in the cAMP signal pathway.

== Receptor regulation ==
GPCRs become desensitized when exposed to their ligand for a long period of time. There are two recognized forms of desensitization: 1) homologous desensitization, in which the activated GPCR is downregulated; and 2) heterologous desensitization, wherein the activated GPCR causes downregulation of a different GPCR. The key reaction of this downregulation is the phosphorylation of the intracellular (or cytoplasmic) receptor domain by protein kinases.

=== Phosphorylation by cAMP-dependent protein kinases ===
Cyclic AMP-dependent protein kinases (protein kinase A) are activated by the signal chain coming from the G protein (that was activated by the receptor) via adenylate cyclase and cyclic AMP (cAMP). In a feedback mechanism, these activated kinases phosphorylate the receptor. The longer the receptor remains active the more kinases are activated and the more receptors are phosphorylated. In β_{2}-adrenoceptors, this phosphorylation results in the switching of the coupling from the G_{s} class of G-protein to the G_{i} class. cAMP-dependent PKA mediated phosphorylation can cause heterologous desensitisation in receptors other than those activated.

=== Phosphorylation by grks ===
The G protein-coupled receptor kinases (GRKs) are protein kinases that phosphorylate only active GPCRs. G-protein-coupled receptor kinases (GRKs) are key modulators of G-protein-coupled receptor (GPCR) signaling. They constitute a family of seven mammalian serine-threonine protein kinases that phosphorylate agonist-bound receptor. GRKs-mediated receptor phosphorylation rapidly initiates profound impairment of receptor signaling and desensitization. Activity of GRKs and subcellular targeting is tightly regulated by interaction with receptor domains, G protein subunits, lipids, anchoring proteins and calcium-sensitive proteins.

Phosphorylation of the receptor can have two consequences:

1. Translocation: The receptor is, along with the part of the membrane it is embedded in, brought to the inside of the cell, where it is dephosphorylated within the acidic vesicular environment and then brought back. This mechanism is used to regulate long-term exposure, for example, to a hormone, by allowing resensitisation to follow desensitisation. Alternatively, the receptor may undergo lysosomal degradation, or remain internalised, where it is thought to participate in the initiation of signalling events, the nature of which depending on the internalised vesicle's subcellular localisation.
2. Arrestin linking: The phosphorylated receptor can be linked to arrestin molecules that prevent it from binding (and activating) G proteins, in effect switching it off for a short period of time. This mechanism is used, for example, with rhodopsin in retina cells to compensate for exposure to bright light. In many cases, arrestin's binding to the receptor is a prerequisite for translocation. For example, beta-arrestin bound to β_{2}-adrenoreceptors acts as an adaptor for binding with clathrin, and with the beta-subunit of AP2 (clathrin adaptor molecules); thus, the arrestin here acts as a scaffold assembling the components needed for clathrin-mediated endocytosis of β_{2}-adrenoreceptors.

=== Mechanisms of GPCR signal termination ===
As mentioned above, G-proteins may terminate their own activation due to their intrinsic GTP→GDP hydrolysis capability. However, this reaction proceeds at a slow rate (≈0.02 times/sec) and, thus, it would take around 50 seconds for any single G-protein to deactivate if other factors did not come into play. Indeed, there are around 30 isoforms of RGS proteins that, when bound to Gα through their GAP domain, accelerate the hydrolysis rate to ≈30 times/sec. This 1500-fold increase in rate allows for the cell to respond to external signals with high speed, as well as spatial resolution due to limited amount of second messenger that can be generated and limited distance a G-protein can diffuse in 0.03 seconds. For the most part, the RGS proteins are promiscuous in their ability to deactivate G-proteins, while which RGS is involved in a given signaling pathway seems more determined by the tissue and GPCR involved than anything else. In addition, RGS proteins have the additional function of increasing the rate of GTP-GDP exchange at GPCRs, (i.e., as a sort of co-GEF) further contributing to the time resolution of GPCR signaling.

In addition, the GPCR may be desensitized itself. This can occur as:

1. a direct result of ligand occupation, wherein the change in conformation allows recruitment of GPCR-Regulating Kinases (GRKs), which go on to phosphorylate various serine/threonine residues of IL-3 and the C-terminal tail. Upon GRK phosphorylation, the GPCR's affinity for β-arrestin (β-arrestin-1/2 in most tissues) is increased, at which point β-arrestin may bind and act to both sterically hinder G-protein coupling as well as initiate the process of receptor internalization through clathrin-mediated endocytosis. Because only the liganded receptor is desensitized by this mechanism, it is called homologous desensitization
2. the affinity for β-arrestin may be increased in a ligand occupation and GRK-independent manner through phosphorylation of different ser/thr sites (but also of IL-3 and the C-terminal tail) by PKC and PKA. These phosphorylations are often sufficient to impair G-protein coupling on their own as well.
3. PKC/PKA may, instead, phosphorylate GRKs, which can also lead to GPCR phosphorylation and β-arrestin binding in an occupation-independent manner. These latter two mechanisms allow for desensitization of one GPCR due to the activities of others, or heterologous desensitization. GRKs may also have GAP domains and so may contribute to inactivation through non-kinase mechanisms as well. A combination of these mechanisms may also occur.

Once β-arrestin is bound to a GPCR, it undergoes a conformational change allowing it to serve as a scaffolding protein for an adaptor complex termed AP-2, which in turn recruits another protein called clathrin. If enough receptors in the local area recruit clathrin in this manner, they aggregate and the membrane buds inwardly as a result of interactions between the molecules of clathrin, in a process called opsonization. Once the pit has been pinched off the plasma membrane due to the actions of two other proteins called amphiphysin and dynamin, it is now an endocytic vesicle. At this point, the adapter molecules and clathrin have dissociated, and the receptor is either trafficked back to the plasma membrane or targeted to lysosomes for degradation.

At any point in this process, the β-arrestins may also recruit other proteins—such as the non-receptor tyrosine kinase (nRTK), c-SRC—which may activate ERK1/2, or other mitogen-activated protein kinase (MAPK) signaling through, for example, phosphorylation of the small GTPase, Ras, or recruit the proteins of the ERK cascade directly (i.e., Raf-1, MEK, ERK-1/2) at which point signaling is initiated due to their close proximity to one another. Another target of c-SRC are the dynamin molecules involved in endocytosis. Dynamins polymerize around the neck of an incoming vesicle, and their phosphorylation by c-SRC provides the energy necessary for the conformational change allowing the final "pinching off" from the membrane.

=== GPCR cellular regulation ===
Receptor desensitization is mediated through a combination phosphorylation, β-arr binding, and endocytosis as described above. Downregulation occurs when endocytosed receptor is embedded in an endosome that is trafficked to merge with an organelle called a lysosome. Because lysosomal membranes are rich in proton pumps, their interiors have low pH (≈4.8 vs. the pH≈7.2 cytosol), which acts to denature the GPCRs. In addition, lysosomes contain many degradative enzymes, including proteases, which can function only at such low pH, and so the peptide bonds joining the residues of the GPCR together may be cleaved. Whether or not a given receptor is trafficked to a lysosome, detained in endosomes, or trafficked back to the plasma membrane depends on a variety of factors, including receptor type and magnitude of the signal. GPCR regulation is additionally mediated by gene transcription factors. These factors can increase or decrease gene transcription and thus increase or decrease the generation of new receptors (up- or down-regulation) that travel to the cell membrane.

== Receptor oligomerization ==
G-protein-coupled receptor oligomerisation is a widespread phenomenon. One of the best-studied examples is the metabotropic GABA_{B} receptor. This so-called constitutive receptor is formed by heterodimerization of GABA_{B}R1 and GABA_{B}R2 subunits. Expression of the GABA_{B}R1 without the GABA_{B}R2 in heterologous systems leads to retention of the subunit in the endoplasmic reticulum. Expression of the GABA_{B}R2 subunit alone, meanwhile, leads to surface expression of the subunit, although with no functional activity (i.e., the receptor does not bind agonist and cannot initiate a response following exposure to agonist). Expression of the two subunits together leads to plasma membrane expression of functional receptor. It has been shown that GABA_{B}R2 binding to GABA_{B}R1 causes masking of a retention signal of functional receptors.

== Origin and diversification of the superfamily ==
Signal transduction mediated by the superfamily of GPCRs dates back to the origin of multicellularity. Mammalian-like GPCRs are found in fungi, and have been classified according to the GRAFS classification system based on GPCR fingerprints. Identification of the superfamily members across the eukaryotic domain, and comparison of the family-specific motifs, have shown that the superfamily of GPCRs have a common origin. Characteristic motifs indicate that three of the five GRAFS families, Rhodopsin, Adhesion, and Frizzled, evolved from the Dictyostelium discoideum cAMP receptors before the split of opisthokonts. Later, the Secretin family evolved from the Adhesion GPCR receptor family before the split of nematodes. Insect GPCRs appear to be in their own group and Taste2 is identified as descending from Rhodopsin. Note that the Secretin/Adhesion split is based on presumed function rather than signature, as the classical Class B (7tm_2, Pfam PF00002) is used to identify both in the studies.

== See also ==
- G protein-coupled receptors database
- List of MeSH codes (D12.776)
- Metabotropic receptor
- Orphan receptor
- Pepducins, a class of drug candidates targeted at GPCRs
- Receptor activated solely by a synthetic ligand, a technique for control of cell signaling through synthetic GPCRs
- TOG superfamily
