= GRAFS =

Gene family

The GPCR superfamily is the largest gene family in the human genome containing approximately 800 genes. As the vertebrate superfamily can be phylogenetically grouped into five main families the GRAFS classification system has been proposed.

GRAFS stands for Glutamate, Rhodopsin, Adhesion, Frizzled/Taste2, Secretin. They correspond to classical classes C (class C, glutamate), A (rhodopsin-like), B2 (Secretin receptor family, long N-terminal), F (Frizzled/Smoothened), and B1+3 (other secretin). Taste2 has more recently considered to be closer to Rhodopsin-like receptors.

== See also ==
- G protein-coupled receptor#Classification
