= DeLisi =

DeLisi is an Italian surname. Notable people with that surname include:

- Charles DeLisi, Metcalf Professor of Science and Engineering at Boston University
- Lynn DeLisi, American psychiatrist
- Matt DeLisi, American sociologist
- Scott H. DeLisi, United States Ambassador to Uganda
- Matthew "SuperTF" Delisi, retired professional Overwatch player and content creator

== See also ==
- Ben de Lisi, American fashion designer
