= Fungal mating pheromone receptors =

Family of G-protein-coupled receptors

Fungal pheromone mating factor STE2 GPCR
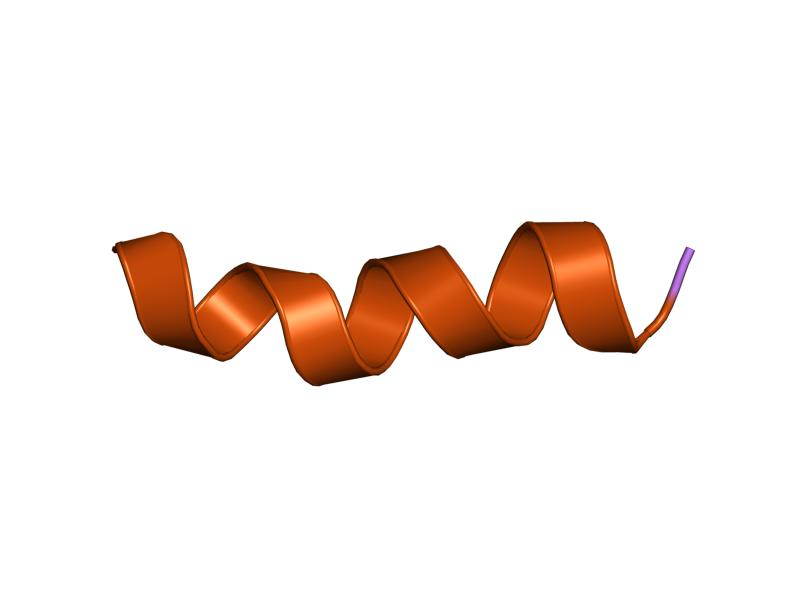
- Structure of a Peptide Segment of the 6th Transmembrane Domain of the Saccharomyces cerevisiae alpha-Factor Receptor.

Identifiers
- Symbol: STE2
- Pfam: PF02116
- InterPro: IPR000366
- SCOP2: 1pjd / SCOPe / SUPFAM
- OPM superfamily: 6
- OPM protein: 2k9p
- CDD: cd14939
Available protein structures:
- PDB: 1pjdA:253-269 IPR000366 PF02116 (ECOD; PDBsum)
- AlphaFold: IPR000366; PF02116

Fungal pheromone mating factor receptors form a distinct family of G-protein-coupled receptors.

== Function ==
Mating factor receptors STE2 and STE3 are integral membrane proteins that may be involved in the response to mating factors on the cell membrane. The amino acid sequences of both receptors contain high proportions of hydrophobic residues grouped into 7 domains, in a manner reminiscent of the rhodopsins and other receptors believed to interact with G-proteins.
