= Cyclic AMP receptors =

Family of G-protein coupled receptors

Slime mold cyclic AMP receptor

Identifiers
- Symbol: Dicty_CAR
- Pfam: PF05462
- Pfam clan: CL0192
- InterPro: IPR000848
- PROSITE: PDOC00691
- CDD: cd14940
Available protein structures:
- PDB: IPR000848 PF05462 (ECOD; PDBsum)
- AlphaFold: IPR000848; PF05462

Cyclic AMP receptors from slime molds are a distinct family of G-protein coupled receptors. These receptors control development in Dictyostelium discoideum.

In D. discoideum, the cyclic AMP receptors coordinate aggregation of individual cells into a multicellular organism, and regulate the expression of a large number of developmentally-regulated genes. The amino acid sequences of the receptors contain high proportions of hydrophobic residues grouped into 7 domains, in a manner reminiscent of the rhodopsins and other receptors believed to interact with G-proteins. However, while a similar 3D framework has been proposed to account for this, there is no significant sequence similarity between these families: the cAMP receptors thus bear their own unique '7TM' signature.

== See also ==
- cAMP receptor protein
