= High Affinity K+ transporter HAK5 =

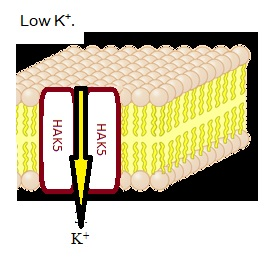
This image shows how the HAK5 is activated only when the plant is in a low potassium environment, which then increases the cells affinity for potassium ions. This is the protein sequence of the High Affinity K^{+} transporter, HAK5.

High Affinity K^{+} transporter HAK5 is a transport protein found on the cell surface membrane of plants under conditions of potassium deprivation. It is believed to act as a symporter for protons and the potassium ion, K^{+}. Firstly discovered in barley, receiving the name of HvHAK1, it was soon after identified in the model plant Arabidopsis thaliana and named HAK5. These transporters belongs to the subgroup I of the KT-HAK-KUP family of plant proteins with obvious homology with both bacterial and fungal transport systems, which experienced a major diversification following land conquest. KT-HAK-KUP transporters are one of four different types of K^{+} transporter within the cell, but are unique as they do not have a putative pore forming domain like the other three; Shaker channels, KCO channels, HKT transporters. It is activated when the plant is situated in low soil with low potassium concentration, and has been shown to be located in higher concentration in the epidermis and vasculature of K^{+} deprived plants. By turning on, it increases the plants affinity (uptake) of potassium. Potassium plays a vital role in the plants growth, reproduction, immunity, ion homeostasis, and osmosis, which ensures the plants survival. It is the highest cationic molecule within the plant, accounting for 10% of the plants dry weight, which makes its uptake into the plant important. Each plant species has its own HAK5 transporter that is specific to that species and has different levels of affinity to K^{+}. To operate and activate the HAK5 transporter, the external concentration of K^{+} must be lower than 10μM and up to 200μM. In Arabidopsis plants, when external potassium concentration is lower than 10μM, it is only HAK5 that is involved with the uptake of K^{+}, then between 10 and 200μM both HAK5 and AKT1 are involved with the uptake of K^{+}. HAK5 is coupled with CBL9/CIPK23 kinase's although the mechanism behind this has not yet been understood.

== Interaction ==
The High Affinity K^{+} transporter interacts with the following proteins

- ILK1
- CBL9- CIPK23
- AKT1

== Activation ==
CIPK23 acts to phosphorylate HAK5, the phosphorylation is what activates the HAK5 to take up K^{+}. HAK5 is positively controlled by CIPK23- CBL1-9 complexes, Ca^{2+} binds with CBL1-9, which then combines with CIPK23 to form a CIPK23/CBL complex, the complex then initiates the up-regulation of the HAK5 protein transporter by phosphorylating the N- terminus of the HAK5.

This mechanism acts in a similar way in which ATK1,(another K^{+} transporter) is activated, however the only difference is that ATK1 only interacts with CBL1 and CBL9, whereas HAK5 interacts with CBL1, CBL8, CBL9 and CBL10.

== Functions ==
High Affinity K^{+} transporter HAK5 effects multiple functions of the plant when in low potassium concentrations these are;

- Osmosis
- Ion Homeostasis
- Immune Response
- Growth

=== Osmosis ===
Higher levels of potassium in the roots creates a greater amount of photosynthesis in the leaves by helping to control osmosis occurring throughout the cells. By controlling potassium, the HAK5 potassium transporter plays this important role in osmosis, and creates large influxes of water molecules to the plant to ensure its survival. By increasing the affinity of potassium uptake within the plant, it lowers the concentration of water within the cell. This increases the concentration of solute outside, creating a hypotonic solute. The water will then move into the plant cell via osmosis.

=== Ion homeostasis ===
A cell membrane consists of many transport proteins that allow for ion transport, as ions can not simply pass through the gradient due to their charge. High Affinity K^{+} transporter HAK5, is important for the regulation of K^{+} ions within the cell. When there is a lack of K^{+}, the HAK5 transporter is activated to uptake K^{+}. This occurs when there is high salinity within the soil, which often happens within the crop industry. If the soil has a high salinity content, this means Na^{+} from NaCl competes with K^{+} for uptake because they are similar ions and use the same transporters. However, K^{+} accounts for the activation of over 50 enzymes, which Na^{+} cannot be a substitute. With HAK5 transporters, this competition is lowered, as there is a specific transporter for K^{+} that insures its uptake. The transporter for K^{+} ensures that the K^{+} and Na^{+} maintain homeostasis in the plant. K^{+} is required for environmental changes like putting the plant into a higher salinity situation. K^{+} ensures plants are able to adapt to these changes. The only way in which they are able to obtain this K^{+} whilst in high salinity conditions is through HAK5 transporters regulating the amount because it is only turned on when there is a low concentration of K^{+} in the soil.

=== Immune response ===
HAK5 is linked to disease prevention because if there is a lack of K^{+} or nutrients within a plant or cell, bacterial growth is promoted. K^{+} is important for the generation of PAMPs (pathogen-associated molecular patterns) recognition, which is involved in the innate immune system for living cells. PAMPs are the main molecules that run the innate immune system. They consist of either glycans or gylcoconjugates, and they pair with pattern recognition receptors (PRR) to initiate an immune response. They send signals to the host cells to show there is a pathogen present. One of the best PRR is FLS2; it binds to flg22 (flagellin), and after just minutes, signaling responses such as kinase cascades, production of reactive oxygen species (ROS), and extracellular alkalization are stimulated. During PAMPs, ion transport across the plasma membrane is important. One particular important ion is K^{+}. The loss of K^{+} promotes the activation of PAMPs. The loss of anions help the growth of bacteria and the PAMPs system works to fight against foreign pathogens such as bacteria. PRRs recognize PAMPs when there is an infection within the cell. During extreme limitations to K^{+}, HAK5 is the only transporter. When PAMPs are triggered a large number of K^{+} are introduced to the cell, which signals a downstream immune response. In animal cells the toll-like receptor TLR4 binds the bacterial PAMP LPS (lipopolysaccharide) and induces K+ efflux through the MaxiK K+ channel, activating signal cascades and release of the pro-inflammatory tumor necrosis factor-α HAK5 works alongside other kinase's to help with the immune response within a cell. The main kinase that works with this transporter is Intergrin- Linked Kinase 1 (ILK1). ILK1 works to increase the amount of HAK5 transporters on the plasma membrane during abiotic stress which increases the influx of K^{+}. ILK1 has also been shown to phosphorylate the N-terminal of HAK5, which contributes to plant growth. The phosphorylation helps to aid in the regulation of the HAK5, as well as other complexes such as CBL1 and CIPK23. Those complexes help to enhance HAK5 transport of K^{+}, although the true mechanism is currently unknown.

=== Growth ===
HAK5 is important for the plant's growth, especially when the plant is in a low potassium soil environment. This is because in this situation the HAK5 transporter is turned on and has a high affinity for the uptake of potassium, which is important for the growth of the plant. Bpth macro and micro-nutrients are important in enzyme activation, photosynthesis and protein synthesis- all things that are important to ensure growth of the plant. Potassium is being looked at, as being a new fertilizer for plants in areas that soil is low in potassium. It has been shown to helps increase water consumption and nitrogen use in warm season cereals. By using a potassium fertilizer, the use of the HAK5 transporter will decrease because it is only activated at low levels. However, by adding potassium to the soil, nutrient management within the soil will be better balanced.
