= Integrin-linked kinase =

Protein found in humans

ILK
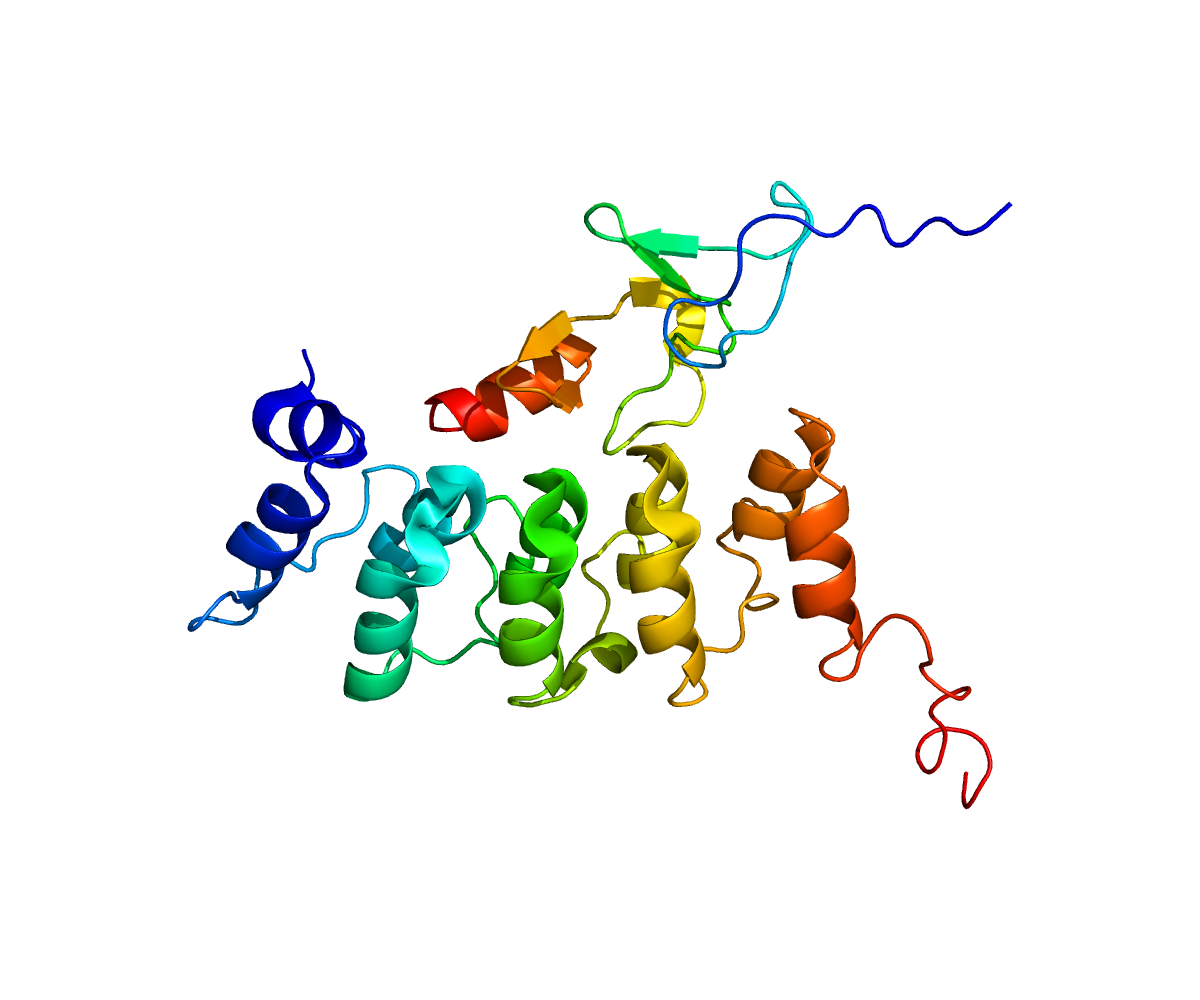

Identifiers
- Aliases: ILK, HEL-S-28, ILK-1, ILK-2, P59, p59integrin linked kinase
- External IDs: OMIM: 602366; MGI: 1195267; GeneCards: ILK
Available structures
PDB	Ortholog search: PDBe RCSB
PDB	List of PDB id codes 4HI9, 2KBX, 3F6Q, 3IXE, 3KMU, 3KMW, 3REP, 4HI8

Gene location (Human)
Chr.	Chromosome 11 (human)
Band	11p15.4	Start	6,603,708 bp
Band	11p15.4	End	6,610,874 bp

Gene location (Mouse)
Chr.	Chromosome 7 (mouse)
Band	7|7 E3	Start	105,385,799 bp
Band	7|7 E3	End	105,392,132 bp
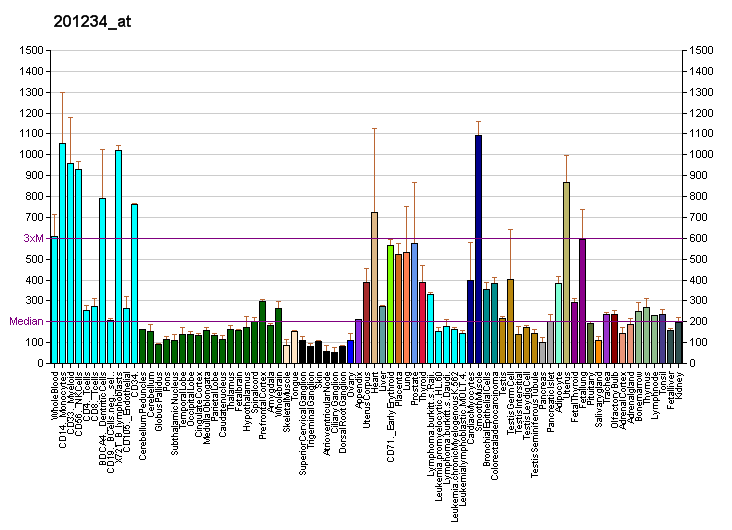
RNA expression pattern
Bgee	Human / Mouse (ortholog); Top expressed in: body of uterus; popliteal artery; tibial arteries; right coronary artery; muscle layer of sigmoid colon; thoracic aorta; ascending aorta; Descending thoracic aorta; saphenous vein; left coronary artery / Top expressed in: uterus; granulocyte; umbilical cord; ascending aorta; optic nerve; tunica media of zone of aorta; genital tubercle; tail of embryo; cervix; efferent ductule; More reference expression data
BioGPS	More reference expression data
Gene ontology
Molecular function	transferase activity; nucleotide binding; protein kinase activity; SH3 domain binding; kinase activity; integrin binding; protein serine/threonine kinase activity; protein binding; ATP binding; protein kinase binding; signal transducer activity
Cellular component	cell projection; membrane; cell-cell junction; plasma membrane; sarcomere; nucleoplasm; dendritic shaft; cell junction; soma; terminal bouton; axon; costamere; lamellipodium; stress fiber; cytoplasm; cytosol; focal adhesion
Biological process	fibroblast migration; negative regulation of neuron apoptotic process; negative regulation of smooth muscle cell proliferation; neuron projection morphogenesis; positive regulation of protein kinase B signaling; regulation of actin cytoskeleton organization; positive regulation of MAP kinase activity; protein kinase B signaling; protein heterooligomerization; negative regulation of protein kinase activity; phosphorylation; myelin assembly; positive regulation of cell-matrix adhesion; positive regulation of cell migration; positive regulation of canonical Wnt signaling pathway; Schwann cell development; negative regulation of neural precursor cell proliferation; outflow tract morphogenesis; negative regulation of smooth muscle cell migration; negative regulation of apoptotic process; myelination in peripheral nervous system; positive regulation of axonogenesis; positive regulation of transcription, DNA-templated; protein phosphorylation; negative regulation of cardiac muscle cell apoptotic process; branching involved in ureteric bud morphogenesis; positive regulation of osteoblast differentiation; positive regulation of dendrite morphogenesis; cell projection organization; positive regulation of myoblast differentiation; peptidyl-serine phosphorylation; establishment or maintenance of epithelial cell apical/basal polarity; regulation of cell growth; positive regulation of cell population proliferation; positive regulation of BMP signaling pathway; integrin-mediated signaling pathway; substrate adhesion-dependent cell spreading; positive regulation of phosphorylation; cell-matrix adhesion; cell population proliferation; positive regulation of axon extension; platelet aggregation; nerve development; positive regulation of MAPK cascade; cell junction assembly; MAPK cascade; multicellular organism development; supramolecular fiber organization; tumor necrosis factor-mediated signaling pathway; positive regulation of NIK/NF-kappaB signaling
Sources:Amigo / QuickGO
Orthologs
Databases	NCBI: entry; OMA: entry
Species	Human	Mouse
Entrez	3611	16202
Ensembl	ENSG00000166333	ENSMUSG00000030890
UniProt	Q13418	O55222
RefSeq (mRNA)	NM_001014794; NM_001014795; NM_001278441; NM_001278442; NM_004517	NM_001161724; NM_010562
RefSeq (protein)	NP_001014794; NP_001014795; NP_001265370; NP_001265371; NP_004508	NP_001155196; NP_034692
Location (UCSC)	Chr 11: 6.6 – 6.61 Mb	Chr 7: 105.39 – 105.39 Mb
PubMed search
- Wikidata
View/Edit Human	View/Edit Mouse

Integrin-linked kinase is an enzyme that in humans is encoded by the ILK gene involved with integrin-mediated signal transduction. Mutations in ILK are associated with cardiomyopathies. It is a 59 kDa protein originally identified in a yeast-two hybrid screen with integrin β1 as the bait protein. Since its discovery, ILK has been associated with multiple cellular functions including cell migration, proliferation, and adhesion.

Integrin-linked kinases (ILKs) are a subfamily of Raf-like kinases (RAF). The structure of ILK consists of three features: 5 ankyrin repeats in the N-terminus, Phosphoinositide binding motif and extreme N-terminus of kinase catalytic domain. Integrins lack enzymatic activity and depend on adapters to signal proteins. ILK is linked to beta-1 and beta-3 integrin cytoplasmic domains and is one of the best described integrins. Although first described as a serine/threonine kinase by Hannigan, important motifs of ILK kinases are still uncharacterized. ILK is thought to have a role in development regulation and tissue homeostasis, however it was found that in flies, worms and mice ILK activity isn't required to regulate these processes.

Animal ILKs have been linked to the pinch- parvin complex which control muscle development. Mice lacking ILK were embryonic lethal due to lack of organized muscle cell development. In mammals ILK lacks catalytic activity but supports scaffolding protein functions for focal adhesions. In plants, ILKs signal complexes to focal adhesion sites. ILKs of plants contain multiple ILK genes. Unlike animals that contain few ILK genes ILKs have been found to possess oncogenic properties. ILKs control the activity of serine/threonine phosphatases.

== Principle features ==
Transduction of extracellular matrix signals through integrins influences intracellular and extracellular functions, and appears to require interaction of integrin cytoplasmic domains with cellular proteins. Integrin-linked kinase (ILK), interacts with the cytoplasmic domain of beta-1 integrin. Multiple alternatively spliced transcript variants encoding the same protein have been found for this gene. Recent results showed that the C-terminal kinase domain is actually a pseudo-kinase with adaptor function.

In 2008, ILK was found to localize to the centrosome and regulate mitotic spindle organization.

Integrin-linked kinase has been shown to interact with:

- ACP6,
- AKT1,
- ILKAP, and
- LIMS1,

== Function of plant ILK1 ==
ILKs function by interacting with the many transmembrane receptors to regulate different signaling cascades. ILK1 has been found in the root system of most plants where they are co-localized on the plasma membrane and endoplasmic reticulum where they transport ions across the plasma membrane ILK1 is responsible for the control of osmotic and salt stress, control of the uptake of nutrients based on availability and pathogen detection.

=== Osmotic and salt stress ===
ILK1 is linked to hyperosmotic stress sensitivity. ILK1 reduced salt stress in seedlings placed in solution with increased concentrations of salt. ILK1 concentrations remain fairly constant throughout development regardless of a high salt exposure. Previously, it was believed that K^{+} accumulation was reduced in increased salt concentration. K^{+} homeostasis is not affected in high salt concentrations. During periods of high salt stress, K^{+} concentrations in the presence of ILK1 was maintained at the existing level. Potassium transport is required for flg22 root growth inhibition and potassium transport was affected by flg22.

Potassium levels modulate the activation of flg22, a flagellin peptide composed of 22 amino acids that triggers pathogen-associated molecular patterns (PAMPs). PAMPs functions by activating regulators of bacterial pathogen alert system. Ion concentration levels of Mn^{2+}, Mg^{2+}, S and Ca^{2+} were also affected after PAMP regulators were mobilized.

=== Nutrient uptake ===
Potassium (K^{+}) is responsible for osmoregulation, membrane potential maintenance and turgor pressure of plant cells which in turn mediates stomata movement and growth of tubules within the plant. Photosynthesis and other metabolic pathways are controlled by potassium. When sufficient K^{+} uptake is not met, PAMPs are activated. Calmodulins, specifically CML9, have appeared as important genes to interact with ILK1 and regulate potassium levels within the cell. While CLM9 primarily regulates Ca^{2+} it is linked to a yet identified K^{+}/Ca^{2+} influx channel. While interactions are known to occur between CML9 and ILK1, ILK1 Is not a direct phosphorylation target of CML9. With the addition of CML9, autophosphorylation of ILK1 is diminished, the present irrespective of calcium available for uptake.

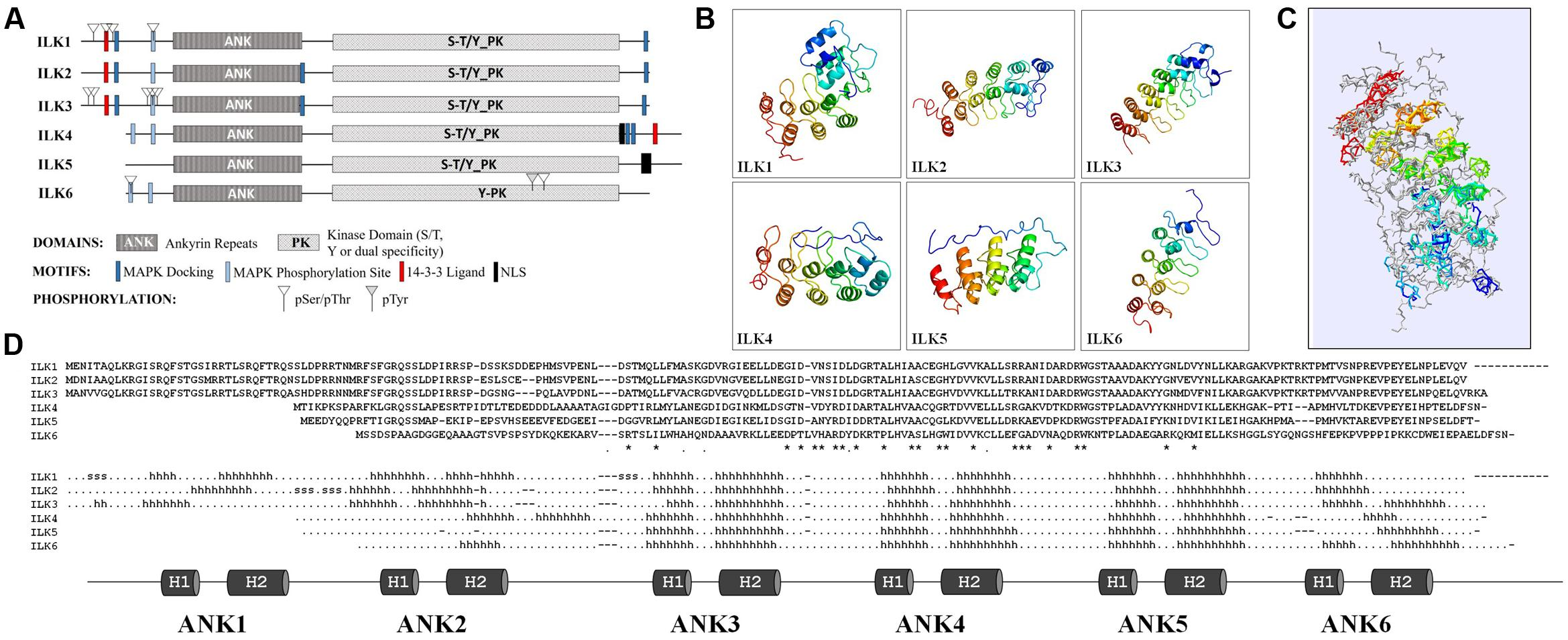
A) Full length protein sequence of Arabidopsis. B) 3D structures of ILK repeats. C) N-terminal is blue C-terminal is red. Shows the succession of secondary elements. D) Amino acid sequence of ILK.

ILK1 is also affected by presence or absence of manganese (Mn^{2+}). Autophosphorylation and substrate phosphorylation occurred when exposed to both Mn^{2+} and Mg^{2+.} Mn^{2+} and was dose dependent where Mg^{2+} was not. Specific ILK autophosphorylation sites were found in the presence of Mn^{2+} but not in the presence of Mg^{2+} which supports the ILK1 dependent phosphorylation suggested above. Mass spectrometry revealed no other kinases were present to trigger this response.

=== Pathogen detection ===
ILK1 has been found to promote resistance in bacterial pathogens. ILK1 is required for flg22 sensitivity in seedlings. A catalytically inactive version of ILK1 was compared with catalytically active versions of ILK1 to see the level of resistance when challenged with bacterial pathogens. Plants inoculated with inactive ILK1 were more susceptible to bacterial infection than active ILK1 suggesting that ILK1 is needed for bacterial pathogen detection. While ILK1 is involved in bacterial pathogen detection it is not used for effect induced defenses.

ILK1 increases PAMP response and basal immunity through phosphorylation of MPK3 and MPK6 and operates independently in reactive oxygen species (ROS) production. High Affinity Potassium uptake mediators such as HAK5 have also been found to be integral in the signaling of flg22. HAK5 function when potassium levels are low. Flg22 has been shown to depolarize the cell's plasma membrane with HAK5 and ILK1 working together to mediate ion homeostasis to assist with both short and long term actions such as growth and suppression thereof.
