= Brain-specific angiogenesis inhibitor =

Protein family

brain-specific angiogenesis inhibitor 1

Identifiers
- Symbol: BAI1
- NCBI gene: 575
- HGNC: 943
- OMIM: 602682
- RefSeq: XM_001130169
- UniProt: O14514

Other data
- Locus: Chr. 8 q24
Search for
- Structures: Swiss-model
- Domains: InterPro

brain-specific angiogenesis inhibitor 2

Identifiers
- Symbol: BAI2
- NCBI gene: 576
- HGNC: 944
- OMIM: 602683
- RefSeq: NM_001703
- UniProt: O60241

Other data
- Locus: Chr. 1 p35
Search for
- Structures: Swiss-model
- Domains: InterPro

brain-specific angiogenesis inhibitor 3

Identifiers
- Symbol: BAI3
- NCBI gene: 577
- HGNC: 945
- OMIM: 602684
- RefSeq: NM_001704
- UniProt: O60242

Other data
- Locus: Chr. 6 q12
Search for
- Structures: Swiss-model
- Domains: InterPro

Brain-specific angiogenesis inhibitors are G-protein coupled receptors belonging to the class B secretin subfamily. Members include:

- Brain-specific angiogenesis inhibitor 1
- Brain-specific angiogenesis inhibitor 2
- Brain-specific angiogenesis inhibitor 3
