= VIPR2 =

Protein-coding gene in the species Homo sapiens

Identifiers
- Aliases: VIPR2, C16DUPq36.3, DUP7q36.3, PACAP-R-3, PACAP-R3, VIP-R-2, VPAC2, VPAC2R, VPCAP2R, vasoactive intestinal peptide receptor 2
- External IDs: OMIM: 601970; MGI: 107166; GeneCards: VIPR2
Available structures
PDB	Ortholog search: PDBe RCSB
PDB	List of PDB id codes 2X57

Gene location (Human)
Chr.	Chromosome 7 (human)
Band	7q36.3	Start	159,028,175 bp
Band	7q36.3	End	159,144,867 bp

Gene location (Mouse)
Chr.	Chromosome 12 (mouse)
Band	12 62.59 cM|12 F2	Start	116,041,346 bp
Band	12 62.59 cM|12 F2	End	116,109,881 bp
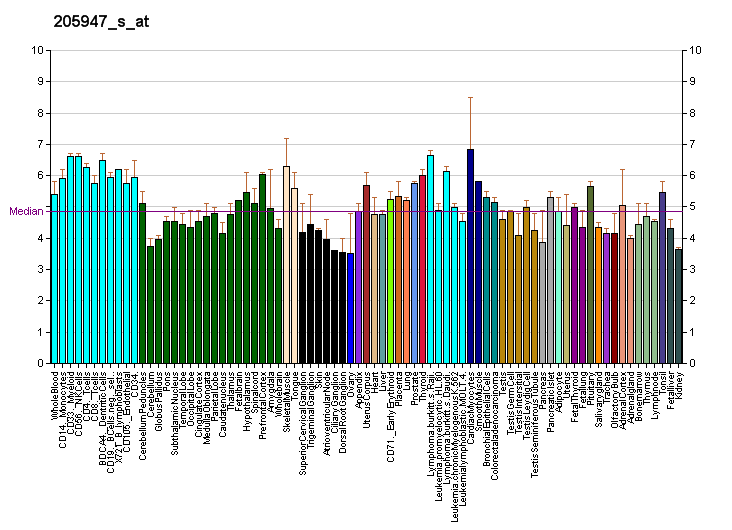

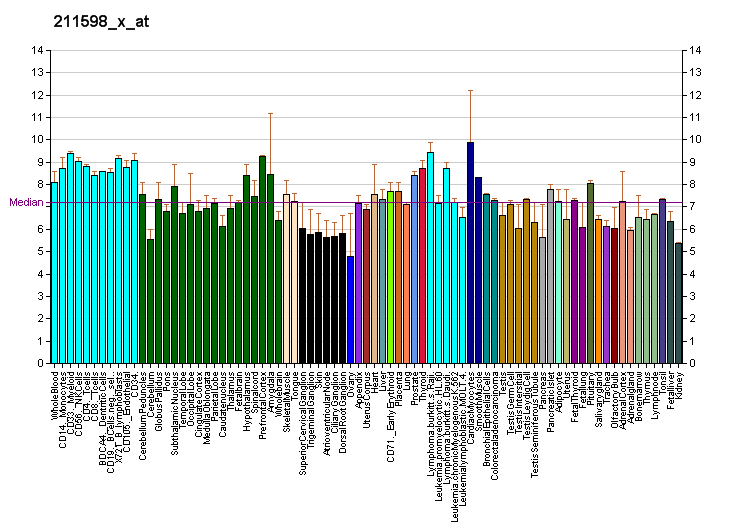

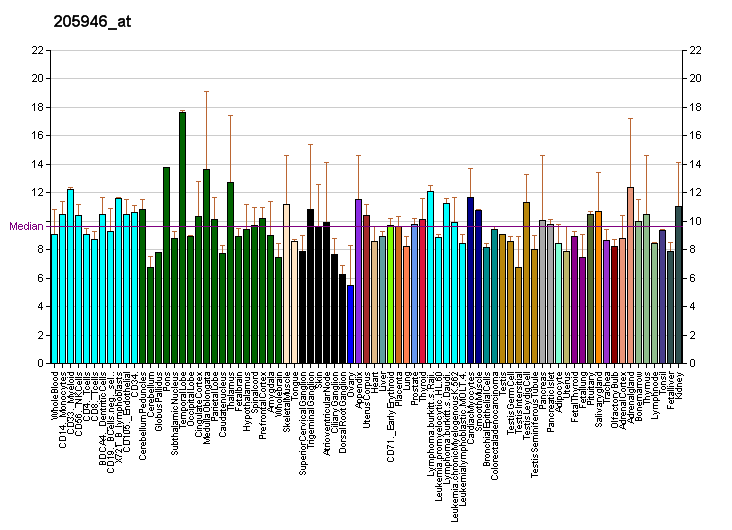
RNA expression pattern
Bgee	Human / Mouse (ortholog); Top expressed in: gastric mucosa; apex of heart; left ventricle; body of pancreas; canal of the cervix; ascending aorta; tibial arteries; Descending thoracic aorta; left ovary; muscle layer of sigmoid colon / Top expressed in: neural layer of retina; suprachiasmatic nucleus; embryo; cerebellar cortex; ventricular zone; muscle of thigh; embryo; dentate gyrus of hippocampal formation granule cell; stomach; lens; More reference expression data
BioGPS	More reference expression data
Gene ontology
Molecular function	G protein-coupled receptor activity; vasoactive intestinal polypeptide receptor activity; transmembrane signaling receptor activity; signal transducer activity; G protein-coupled peptide receptor activity; peptide hormone binding
Cellular component	integral component of membrane; plasma membrane; integral component of plasma membrane; membrane
Biological process	cell-cell signaling; cell surface receptor signaling pathway; negative regulation of smooth muscle cell proliferation; signal transduction; activation of adenylate cyclase activity; G protein-coupled receptor signaling pathway
Sources:Amigo / QuickGO
Orthologs
Databases	NCBI: entry; OMA: entry
Species	Human	Mouse
Entrez	7434	22355
Ensembl	ENSG00000106018	ENSMUSG00000011171
UniProt	P41587	P41588
RefSeq (mRNA)	NM_001304522; NM_001308259; NM_003382	NM_009511
RefSeq (protein)	NP_001291451; NP_001295188; NP_003373	NP_033537
Location (UCSC)	Chr 7: 159.03 – 159.14 Mb	Chr 12: 116.04 – 116.11 Mb
PubMed search
- Wikidata
View/Edit Human	View/Edit Mouse

Vasoactive intestinal peptide receptor 2 also known as VPAC_{2}, is a G-protein coupled receptor that in humans is encoded by the VIPR2 gene.

== Tissue distribution ==
VIPR2 is expressed in the uterus, prostate, smooth muscle of the gastrointestinal tract, seminal vesicles and skin, blood vessels and thymus. VIPR2 is also expressed in the cerebellum.

== Function ==
Vasoactive intestinal peptide (VIP) and pituitary adenylate cyclase activating polypeptide (PACAP) are homologous peptides that function as neurotransmitters and neuroendocrine hormones. While the receptors for VIP (VIRP 1 and 2) and PACAP (ADCYAP1R1) share homology, they differ in their substrate specificities and expression patterns. VIPR2 transduction results in upregulation of adenylate cyclase activity. Furthermore, VIPR2 mediates the anti-inflammatory effects of VIP.

Research using VPAC_{2} knockout mice implicate it in the function of the circadian clock, growth, basal energy expenditure and male reproduction.

VIPR2 and/or PAC1 receptor activation is involved in cutaneous active vasodilation in humans.

Splice variants may modify the immunoregulatory contributions of the VIP-VIPR2 axis.

VIPR2 may contribute to autoregulation and/or coupling within the suprachiasmatic nucleus (SCN) core and to control of the SCN shell.

== Clinical significance ==
VIPR2 may play a role in schizophrenia.

The abnormal expression of VIPR2 messenger RNA in gallbladder tissue may play a role in the formation of gall stones and polyps.

== See also ==
- Vasoactive intestinal peptide receptor
- VIPR1
