= VIPR =

VIPR can refer to:

- Volumetric Imaging and Processing of Integrated Radar
- Virus Pathogen Database and Analysis Resource (ViPR), a publicly available database and analysis resource for viral pathogens in the U.S
- Visible Intermodal Prevention and Response team (TSA program in the US)
- VIPR1, a G protein-coupled receptor
- EMC ViPR, a software-defined storage offering
- Vastly undersampled Isotropic Projection Reconstruction of Phase contrast magnetic resonance imaging
- Vasoactive intestinal peptide receptor
