= Anaphylaxis =

Life-threatening allergic reaction

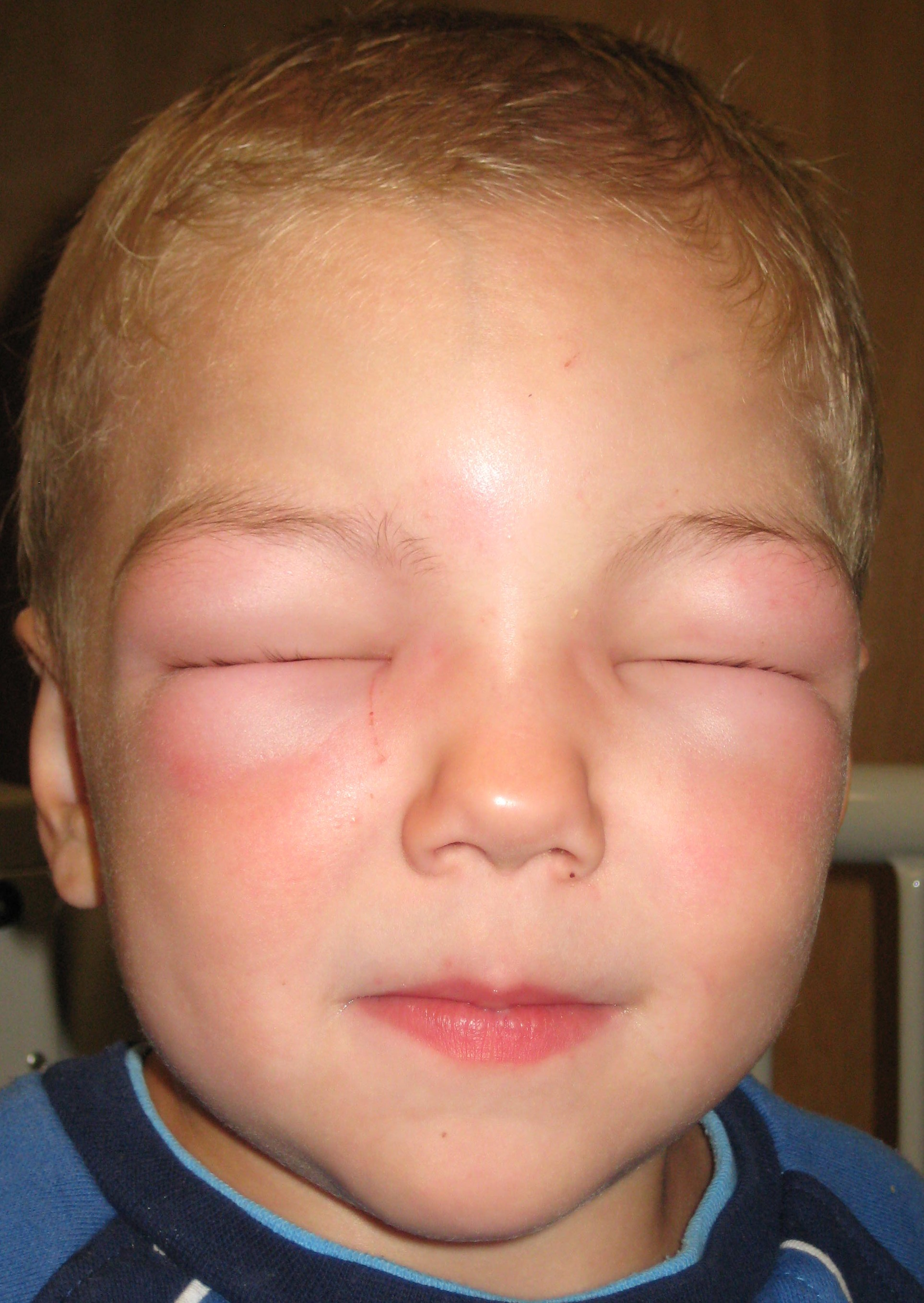
- A child with facial swelling due to anaphylaxis
- Specialty: Emergency medicine, allergy and immunology
- Symptoms: Itchy rash, throat swelling, numbness, shortness of breath, lightheadedness, low blood pressure, vomiting
- Usual onset: Over minutes to hours
- Types: Anaphylactoid reaction, anaphylactic shock, biphasic anaphylaxis
- Causes: Insect bites, foods, medications, drugs/vaccines
- Diagnostic method: Based on symptoms
- Differential diagnosis: Allergic reaction, asthma exacerbation, carcinoid syndrome
- Treatment: Epinephrine, intravenous fluids
- Medication: Epinephrine, corticosteroids, antihistamines
- Frequency: 0.05–2%

Anaphylaxis is a serious and potentially fatal allergic reaction that can progress rapidly. It typically causes more than one of the following: an itchy rash, throat closing due to swelling that can obstruct or stop breathing; severe tongue swelling that can also interfere with or stop breathing; shortness of breath, vomiting, lightheadedness, loss of consciousness, low blood pressure, and medical shock. Symptoms typically start in minutes to hours.

Common causes include allergies to insect bites and stings, allergies to foods, including nuts, peanuts, milk, fish, and eggs; allergies to medications, including some antibiotics and non-steroidal anti-inflammatory drugs (NSAIDs); or allergies to anaesthetics or latex. Other causes can include physical exercise, and cases may also occur in some people due to escalating reactions to simple throat irritation or may also occur without an obvious reason. Mastocytosis and mast cell activation syndrome are both capable of triggering anaphylaxis. The mechanism involves the release of inflammatory mediators from certain types of white blood cells triggered by either immunologic or non-immunologic mechanisms. Diagnosis is based on symptoms after exposure to a potential allergen.

Urgent medical treatment is required. The primary treatment is epinephrine injection into a muscle, intravenous fluids, then placing the person in a reclining position with feet elevated to help restore normal blood flow. Additional doses of epinephrine may be required. Other measures, such as antihistamines and steroids, are complementary. Carrying an epinephrine autoinjector, commonly called an "epipen", and identification regarding the condition is recommended in people with a history of anaphylaxis.

Worldwide, 0.05–2% experience anaphylaxis at some point in life. Globally, as underreporting declined into the 2010s, the rate appeared to be increasing. It occurs most often in young people and females. Of people who go to a hospital with anaphylaxis in the United States about 99.7% survive.

== Signs and symptoms ==
Signs and symptoms of anaphylaxis

Anaphylaxis typically presents many different symptoms over minutes or hours with an average onset of 5 to 30 minutes if exposure is intravenous and up to 2 hours if from eating food. The most common areas affected include: skin (80–90%), respiratory (70%), gastrointestinal (30–45%), heart and vasculature (10–45%), and central nervous system (10–15%) with usually two or more being involved.

=== Skin ===
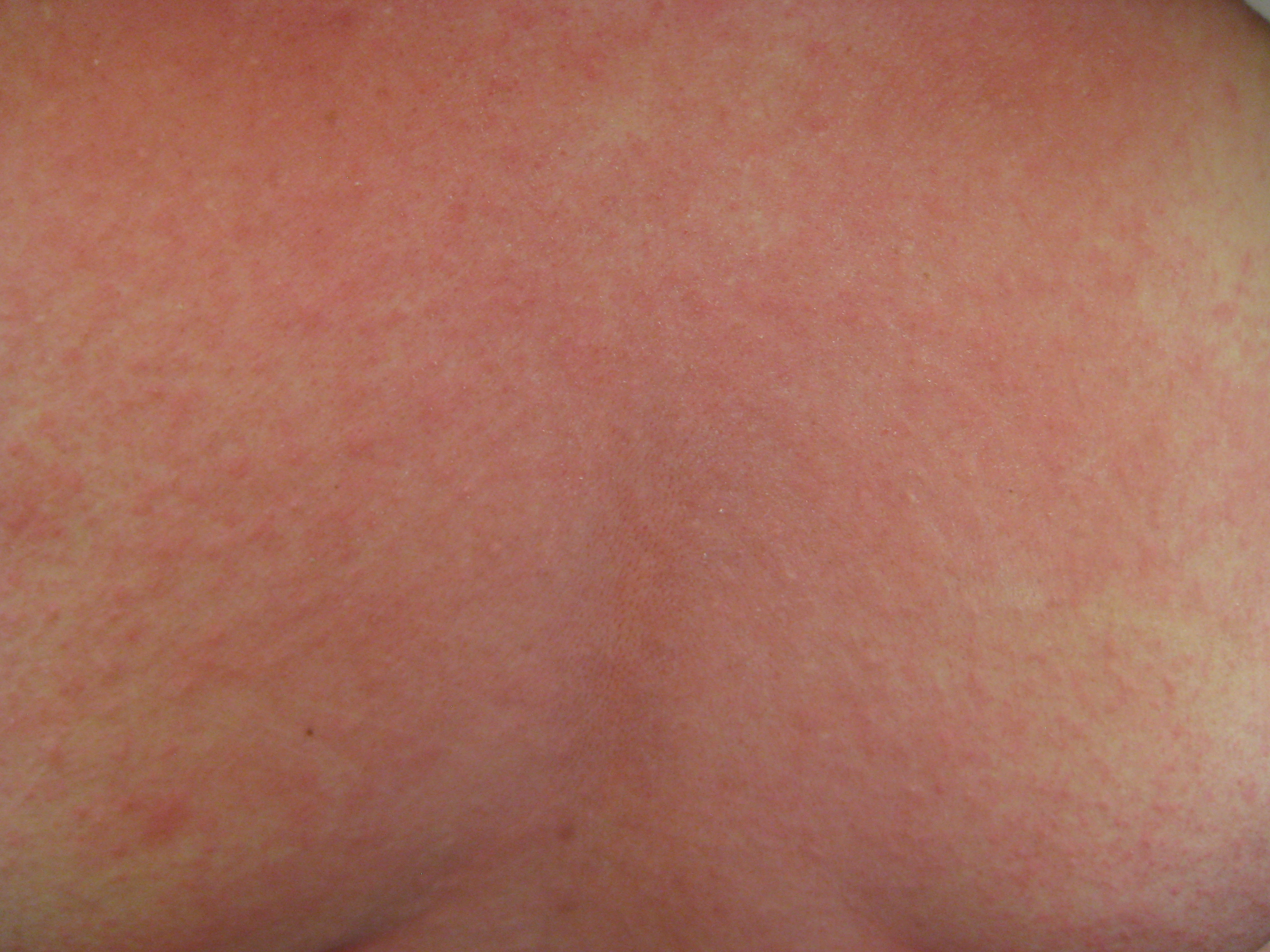
Urticaria and flushing on the chest of a person with anaphylaxis

Symptoms typically include generalized hives, itchiness, flushing, or swelling (angioedema) of the affected tissues. Those with angioedema may describe a burning sensation of the skin rather than itchiness. Swelling of the tongue or throat occurs in up to about 20% of cases. Other features may include a runny nose and swelling of the conjunctiva. The skin may also be blue tinged because of a lack of oxygen.

=== Respiratory ===
Respiratory symptoms and signs that may be present include shortness of breath, wheezes, or stridor. The wheezing is typically caused by spasms of the bronchial muscles while stridor is related to upper airway obstruction secondary to swelling. Hoarseness, pain with swallowing, or a cough may also occur.

=== Cardiovascular ===
While a fast heart rate caused by low blood pressure is more common, a Bezold–Jarisch reflex has been described in 10% of people, where a slow heart rate is associated with low blood pressure. A drop in blood pressure or shock (either distributive or cardiogenic) may cause the feeling of lightheadedness or loss of consciousness. In rare cases, very low blood pressure may be the only sign of anaphylaxis.

Coronary artery spasm may occur with subsequent myocardial infarction, dysrhythmia, or cardiac arrest. Those with underlying coronary disease are at greater risk of cardiac effects from anaphylaxis. The coronary spasm is related to the presence of histamine-releasing cells in the heart.

=== Other ===
Gastrointestinal symptoms may include severe crampy abdominal pain and vomiting. There may be confusion, a loss of bladder control or pelvic pain similar to that of uterine cramps. Dilation of blood vessels around the brain may cause headaches. A feeling of anxiety or of "impending doom" has also been described.

== Causes ==
Anaphylaxis can occur in response to almost any foreign substance. Common triggers include venom from insect bites or stings, foods, and medication. Foods are the most common trigger in children and young adults, while medications and insect bites and stings are more common in older adults. Less common causes include: physical factors, biological agents such as semen, latex, hormonal changes, food additives and colors, and topical medications.

Physical factors such as exercise (known as exercise-induced anaphylaxis) or temperature (either hot or cold) may also act as triggers through their direct effects on mast cells. Events caused by exercise are frequently associated with cofactors such as the ingestion of certain foods or taking an NSAID. Anaphylaxis caused by a combination of exercise and consumption of certain foods is known as food-dependent exercise-induced anaphylaxis (FDEIA). In aspirin-exacerbated respiratory disease (AERD), alcohol is a common trigger. During anesthesia, neuromuscular blocking agents, antibiotics, and latex are the most common causes. The cause remains unknown in 32–50% of cases, referred to as "idiopathic anaphylaxis." Six vaccines (MMR, varicella, influenza, hepatitis B, tetanus, meningococcal) are recognized as a cause for anaphylaxis, and HPV may cause anaphylaxis as well.

=== Food ===
Many foods can trigger anaphylaxis; this may occur upon the first known ingestion. Common triggering foods vary around the world due to cultural cuisine. In Western cultures, ingestion of or exposure to peanuts, wheat, nuts, certain types of seafood like shellfish, milk, fruit and eggs are the most prevalent causes. Sesame is common in the Middle East, while rice and chickpeas are frequently encountered as sources of anaphylaxis in Asia. Severe cases are usually caused by ingesting the allergen, but some people experience a severe reaction upon contact. Children can outgrow their allergies. By age 16, 80% of children with anaphylaxis to milk or eggs and 20% who experience isolated anaphylaxis to peanuts can tolerate these foods. Any type of alcohol, even in small amounts, can trigger anaphylaxis in people with AERD.

=== Medication ===
Any medication may potentially trigger anaphylaxis. The most common are β-lactam antibiotics (such as penicillin) followed by aspirin and NSAIDs. Other antibiotics are implicated less frequently. Anaphylactic reactions to NSAIDs are either agent specific or occur among those that are structurally similar, meaning that those who are allergic to one NSAID can typically tolerate a different one or a different group of NSAIDs. Other relatively common causes include chemotherapy, vaccines, protamine and herbal preparations. Some medications (vancomycin, morphine, x-ray contrast among others) cause anaphylaxis by directly triggering mast cell degranulation.

The frequency of a reaction to an agent partly depends on the frequency of its use and partly on its intrinsic properties. Anaphylaxis to penicillin or cephalosporins occurs only after it binds to proteins inside the body with some agents binding more easily than others. Anaphylaxis to penicillin occurs once in every 2,000 to 10,000 courses of treatment, with death occurring in fewer than one in every 50,000 courses of treatment. Anaphylaxis to aspirin and NSAIDs occurs in about one in every 50,000 persons. If someone reacts to penicillin, his or her risk of a reaction to cephalosporins is greater but still less than one in 1,000. The old radiocontrast agents caused reactions in 1% of cases, while the newer, lower osmolar agents cause reactions in 0.04% of cases. Avoidance of cephalosporins in those with penicillin allergy creates a significantly greater patient safety risk than the low probability of anaphylaxis.

=== Venom ===
Venom from stinging or biting insects such as Hymenoptera (ants, bees, and wasps) or Triatominae (kissing bugs) may cause anaphylaxis in susceptible people. Previous reactions that are anything more than a local reaction around the site of the sting, are a risk factor for future anaphylaxis; however, half of the fatalities have had no previous systemic reaction.

=== Risk factors ===
People with atopic diseases such as asthma, eczema, or allergic rhinitis are at high risk of anaphylaxis from food, latex, and radiocontrast agents but not from injectable medications or stings. One study in children found that 60% had a history of previous atopic diseases, and of children who die from anaphylaxis, more than 90% have asthma. Those with mastocytosis, mast cell activation syndrome (MCAS) or of a higher socioeconomic status are at increased risk.

== Pathophysiology ==
Anaphylaxis is a severe allergic reaction of rapid onset affecting many body systems. It is due to the release of inflammatory mediators and cytokines from mast cells and basophils, typically due to an immunologic reaction but sometimes with non-immunologic mechanisms.

Interleukin (IL)–4 and IL-13 are cytokines important in the initial generation of antibody and inflammatory cell responses to anaphylaxis.

=== Immunologic ===
The vast majority of anaphylaxis is mediated by allergen-specific immunoglobulin E (IgE). In the immunologic mechanism, immunoglobulin E (IgE) binds to the antigen (the foreign material that provokes the allergic reaction). Antigen-bound IgE then activates FcεRI receptors on mast cells and basophils. This leads to the release of inflammatory mediators such as histamine. These mediators subsequently increase the contraction of bronchial smooth muscles, trigger vasodilation, increase the leakage of fluid from blood vessels, and compromise circulatory function.

Rarely, anaphylaxis may be triggered by immunoglobulin G (IgG) antibodies. Allergen-specific IgG is generally considered to be protective against allergic reactions (including anaphylaxis) because it competes with IgE for binding to the allergen (i.e., it is a blocking antibody) and its immune complexes (lattices of antigen and antibody, or in this case, allergen and IgG) inhibit IgE signaling.

=== Non-immunologic ===
Non-immunologic mechanisms involve substances that directly cause the degranulation of mast cells and basophils without ligating the high-affinity IgE receptor. These include agents such as contrast medium, opioids, temperature (hot or cold), and vibration. Sulfites may cause reactions by both immunologic and non-immunologic mechanisms. This is a form of pseudoallergy and is commonly mediated by MRPRX2, a promiscuous receptor that interacts with many substances (especially drugs) to trigger mast cell degranulation without IgE.

=== Mixed type ===
A form of anaphylaxis that has both IgE-dependent and non-IgE-dependent features has been observed as a consequence of some chemotherapy and monoclonal antibodies, manifesting alongside cytokine storm-like features.

== Diagnosis ==
Anaphylaxis is diagnosed on the basis of a person's signs and symptoms. When any one of the following three occurs within minutes or hours of exposure to an allergen there is a high likelihood of anaphylaxis:

1. Involvement of the skin or mucosal tissue plus either respiratory difficulty or a low blood pressure causing symptoms
2. Two or more of the following symptoms after a likely contact with an allergen:
  a. Involvement of the skin or mucosa
  b. Respiratory difficulties
  c. Low blood pressure
  d. Gastrointestinal symptoms
3. Low blood pressure after exposure to a known allergen

Skin involvement may include: hives, itchiness, or a swollen tongue, among others. Respiratory difficulties may include: shortness of breath, stridor, or low oxygen levels, among others. Low blood pressure is defined as a greater than 30% decrease from a person's usual blood pressure. In adults, a systolic blood pressure of less than 90 mmHg is often used.

During an attack, blood tests for tryptase or histamine (released from mast cells) might be useful in diagnosing anaphylaxis due to insect stings or medications. However these tests are of limited use if the cause is food or if the person has a normal blood pressure, and they are not specific for the diagnosis. Notably, hereditary alpha tryptasemia is an autosomal dominant condition present in about 5.7% of the population, a condition that is generally asymptomatic (but may increase the frequency and intensity of allergic reactions) that causes elevated levels of tryptase at baseline, which means that in some people, a tryptase may be elevated independent of anaphylaxis. To ensure that an elevated tryptase is not the result of hereditary alpha tryptasemia, the EAACI recommends repeating a tryptase level 24 hours after resolution of anaphylaxis. Additionally, a normal tryptase does not rule out anaphylaxis.

=== Classification ===
There are three main classifications of anaphylaxis.

1. Anaphylactic shock is associated with systemic vasodilation that causes low blood pressure, which is by definition 30% lower than the person's baseline or below standard values.
2. Biphasic anaphylaxis is the recurrence of symptoms within 1–72 hours after resolution of an initial anaphylactic episode. Estimates of incidence vary between less than 1% and up to 20% of cases. The recurrence typically occurs within 8 hours. It is managed in the same manner as anaphylaxis.
3. Anaphylactoid reaction, non-immune anaphylaxis, or pseudoanaphylaxis, is a type of anaphylaxis that does not involve an allergic reaction but is due to direct mast cell degranulation. Non-immune anaphylaxis is the current term, as of 2018, used by the World Allergy Organization with some recommending that the old terminology, "anaphylactoid", no longer be used.

=== Allergy skin testing ===
Skin allergy testing being carried out on the right arm

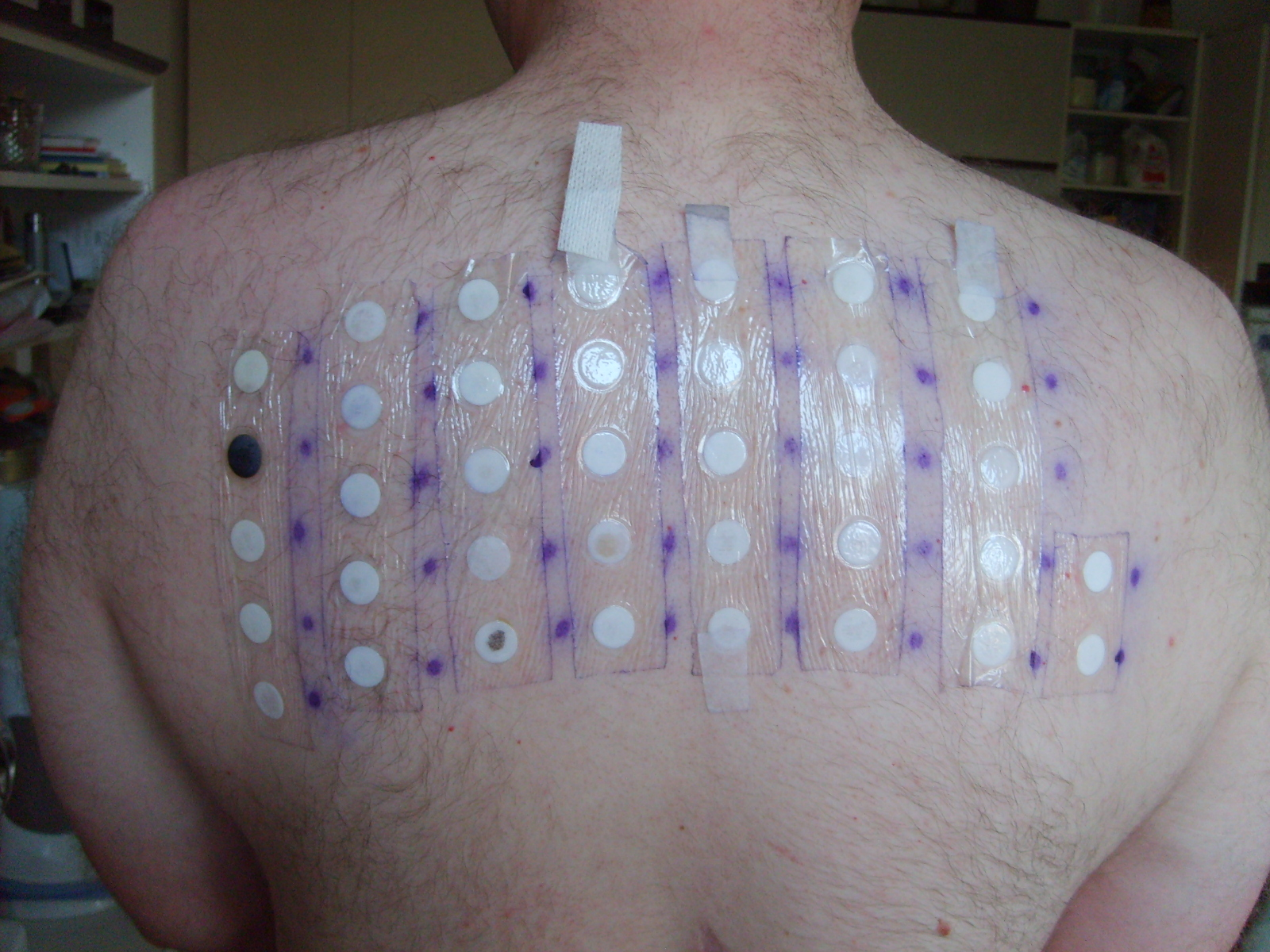
Patch test

Allergy testing may help in determining the trigger. Skin allergy testing is available for certain foods and venoms. Blood testing for specific IgE can be useful to confirm milk, egg, peanut, tree nut, and fish allergies.

Skin testing is available to confirm penicillin allergies, but is not available for other medications. Non-immune forms of anaphylaxis can only be determined by history or exposure to the allergen in question, and not by skin or blood testing.

=== Differential diagnosis ===
It can sometimes be difficult to distinguish anaphylaxis from asthma, syncope, and panic attacks. Asthma however typically does not entail itching or gastrointestinal symptoms, syncope presents with pallor rather than a rash, and a panic attack may have flushing but does not have hives. Other conditions that may present similarly include: scrombroidosis and anisakiasis.

=== Post-mortem findings ===
In a person who died from anaphylaxis, autopsy may show an "empty heart" attributed to reduced venous return from vasodilation and redistribution of intravascular volume from the central to the peripheral compartment. Other signs are laryngeal edema, eosinophilia in lungs, heart and tissues, and evidence of myocardial hypoperfusion. Laboratory findings could detect increased levels of serum tryptase, an increase in total and specific IgE serum levels.

== Prevention ==
Avoidance of the trigger of anaphylaxis is recommended. In cases where this may not be possible, desensitization may be an option. Immunotherapy with Hymenoptera venoms is effective at desensitizing 80–90% of adults and 98% of children against allergies to bees, wasps, hornets, yellowjackets, and fire ants. Oral immunotherapy may be effective at desensitizing some people to certain food including milk, eggs, nuts and peanuts; however, adverse effects are common. For example, many people develop an itchy throat, cough, or lip swelling during immunotherapy. Desensitization is also possible for many medications, however it is usually advised that most people simply avoid the agent in question. In those who react to latex it may be important to avoid cross-reactive foods such as avocados, bananas, and potatoes among others.

Premedications with antihistamines or glucocorticoids does not prevent anaphylaxis, but may be used in specific circumstances, such as rush aeroallergen desensitization or in certain chemotherapy regimens.

== Management ==
Anaphylaxis is a medical emergency that may require resuscitation measures such as airway management, supplemental oxygen, large volumes of intravenous fluids, and close monitoring. Passive leg raise may also be helpful in the emergency management.

Administration of intravenous fluid bolus and epinephrine is the treatment of choice with antihistamines used as adjuncts. A period of in-hospital observation for between 2 and 24 hours is recommended for people once they have returned to normal due to concerns of biphasic anaphylaxis.

=== Epinephrine ===
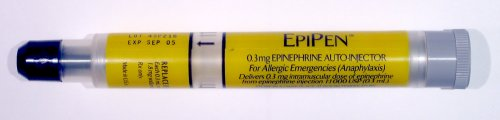
An old version of an EpiPen brand auto-injector

Epinephrine (adrenaline) (1:1000) is the primary treatment for anaphylaxis with no absolute contraindication to its use. It is recommended that an epinephrine solution be given intramuscularly into the mid anterolateral thigh as soon as the diagnosis is suspected. The injection may be repeated every 5 to 15 minutes if there is insufficient response. A second dose is needed in 16–35% of episodes with more than two doses rarely required. The intramuscular route is preferred over subcutaneous administration because the latter may have delayed absorption. It is recommended that after diagnosis and treatment of anaphylaxis, the patient should be kept under observation in an appropriate clinical setting until symptoms have fully resolved. Minor adverse effects from epinephrine include tremors, anxiety, headaches, and palpitations. People on β-blockers may be resistant to the effects of epinephrine, but this is less of an issue with "cardioselective" β1-blockers. In this situation, if epinephrine is not effective, intravenous glucagon can be administered, which has a mechanism of action independent of β-receptors.

If necessary, it can also be given intravenously using a dilute epinephrine solution. Intravenous epinephrine, however, has been associated both with dysrhythmia and myocardial infarction. Epinephrine autoinjectors used for self-administration typically come in two doses, one for adults or children who weigh more than 25 kg and one for children who weigh 10 to 25 kg.

Most recently, the FDA has approved an intranasal form of epinephrine under the brand name Neffy, on the basis of its ability to attain levels of epinephrine in people that are believed to be protective against anaphylaxis. There are currently no clinical data on its effectiveness.

Delayed administration of epinephrine in anaphylaxis is associated with increased rates of hospitalization and mortality.

=== Others ===
Antihistamines (both H1 and H2), while commonly used and assumed effective based on theoretical reasoning, are poorly supported by evidence. A 2007 Cochrane review did not find any good-quality studies upon which to base recommendations and they are not believed to affect airway edema or spasm. Corticosteroids are unlikely to make a difference in the current episode of anaphylaxis, but may be used in the hope of decreasing the risk of biphasic anaphylaxis. Their prophylactic effectiveness in these situations is uncertain. Nebulized salbutamol may be effective for bronchospasm that does not resolve with epinephrine. Methylene blue has been used in those not responsive to other measures due to its presumed effect of relaxing smooth muscle.

=== Preparedness ===
People prone to anaphylaxis are advised to have an allergy action plan. Parents are advised to inform schools of their children's allergies and what to do in case of an anaphylactic emergency. The action plan usually includes use of epinephrine autoinjectors, the recommendation to wear a medical alert bracelet, and counseling on avoidance of triggers. Immunotherapy is available for certain triggers to prevent future episodes of anaphylaxis. A multi-year course of subcutaneous desensitization has been found effective against stinging insects, while oral desensitization is effective for many foods.

In July 2026, the United Kingdom passed Benedict's Law an amendment to the Children's Wellbeing and Schools Act 2026 which requires every school in England to hold spare adrenaline auto-injectors and provide compulsory allergy training for all staff.

== Prognosis ==
In those in whom the cause is known and prompt treatment is available, the prognosis is good. Even if the cause is unknown, if appropriate preventive medication is available, the prognosis is generally good. Usually, death occurs due to either respiratory failure (typically involving asphyxia) or cardiovascular complications, such as cardiovascular shock, with 0.7–20% of cases causing death. There have been cases of death occurring within minutes. Outcomes in those with exercise-induced anaphylaxis are typically good, with fewer and less severe episodes as people get older.

== Epidemiology ==
The number of people who get anaphylaxis is 4–100 per 100,000 persons per year, with a lifetime risk of 0.05–2%. About 30% of affected people get more than one attack. Exercise-induced anaphylaxis affects about 1 in 2000 young people.

Rates appear to be increasing: the numbers in the 1980s were approximately 20 per 100,000 per year, while in the 1990s, it was 50 per 100,000 per year. The increase appears to be primarily for food-induced anaphylaxis. The risk is greatest in young people and females.

Anaphylaxis leads to as many as 500–1,000 deaths per year (2.7 per million) in the United States, 20 deaths per year in the United Kingdom (0.33 per million), and 15 deaths per year in Australia (0.64 per million). Another estimate from the United States puts the death rate at 0.7 per million. Mortality rates have decreased between the 1970s and 2000s. In Australia, death from food-induced anaphylaxis occur primarily in women while deaths due to insect bites primarily occur in males. Death from anaphylaxis is most commonly triggered by medications.

== History ==
The conditions of anaphylaxis have been known since ancient times. French physician François Magendie had described how rabbits were killed by repeated injections of egg albumin in 1839. However, the phenomenon was discovered by two French physiologists Charles Richet and Paul Portier. In 1901, Albert I, Prince of Monaco requested Richet and Portier join him on a scientific expedition around the French coast of the Atlantic Ocean, specifically to study on the toxin produced by cnidarians (like jellyfish and sea anemones). Richet and Portier boarded Albert's ship Princesse Alice II for ocean exploration to make collections of the marine animals.

Richet and Portier extracted a toxin called hypnotoxin from their collection of jellyfish (but the real source was later identified as Portuguese man o' war) and sea anemone (Actinia sulcata). In their first experiment on the ship, they injected a dog with the toxin in an attempt to immunise the dog, which instead developed a severe reaction (hypersensitivity). In 1902, they repeated the injections in their laboratory and found that dogs normally tolerated the toxin at the first injection, but on re-exposure, three weeks later with the same dose, they always developed fatal shock. They also found that the effect was not related to the doses of toxin used, as even small amounts in secondary injections were lethal. Thus, instead of inducing tolerance (prophylaxis), which they expected, they discovered effects of the toxin as deadly.

In 1902, Richet introduced the term aphylaxis to describe the condition of lack of protection. He later changed the term to anaphylaxis on the grounds of euphony. The term is from the Greek ἀνά-, ana-, meaning "against", and φύλαξις, phylaxis, meaning "protection". On 15 February 1902, Richet and Portier jointly presented their findings before the Societé de Biologie in Paris. The moment is regarded as the birth of allergy (the term invented by Clemens von Pirquet in 1906) study (allergology). Richet continued to study the phenomenon and was eventually awarded the Nobel Prize in Physiology or Medicine for his work on anaphylaxis in 1913.

=== Terminology ===
The word is derived from Ancient Greek: ἀνά, romanized: ana, lit. 'up', and Ancient Greek: φύλαξις, romanized: phylaxis, lit. 'protection'.

== Research ==
There are ongoing efforts to develop sublingual epinephrine to treat anaphylaxis. Trials of sublingual epinephrine, currently called AQST-108 (dipivefrin) and sponsored by Aquestive Therapeutics, are in phase 1 trials as of December 2021. Subcutaneous injection of the anti-IgE antibody omalizumab is being studied as a method of preventing recurrence, but it is not yet recommended. Omalizumab-associated anaphylaxis has been observed in less than 0.1% of patients treated for moderate to severe persistent allergic asthma using subcutaneous omalizumab injections.
