= Pituitary adenylate cyclase-activating peptide =

Protein-coding gene in the species Homo sapiens

ADCYAP1
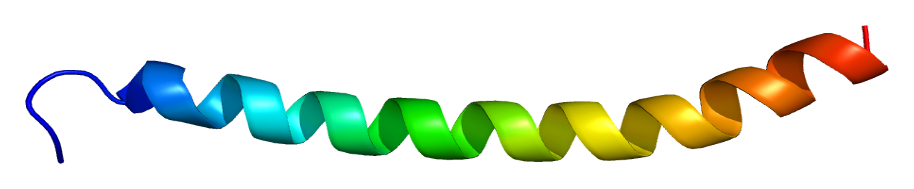

Identifiers
- Aliases: ADCYAP1, PACAP, adenylate cyclase activating polypeptide 1
- External IDs: OMIM: 102980; MGI: 105094; GeneCards: ADCYAP1
Available structures
PDB	Ortholog search: PDBe RCSB
PDB	List of PDB id codes 1GEA, 2D2P, 2JOD

Gene location (Human)
Chr.	Chromosome 18 (human)
Band	18p11.32	Start	904,871 bp
Band	18p11.32	End	912,172 bp

Gene location (Mouse)
Chr.	Chromosome 17 (mouse)
Band	17|17 E5	Start	93,506,445 bp
Band	17|17 E5	End	93,513,965 bp
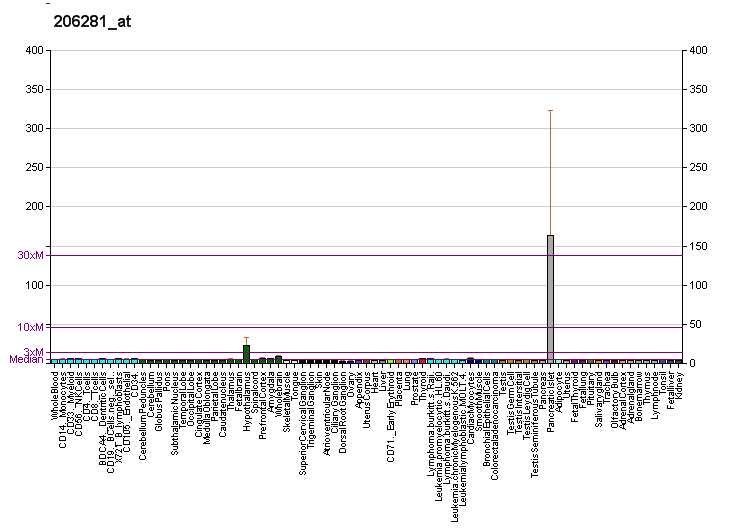
RNA expression pattern
Bgee	Human / Mouse (ortholog); Top expressed in: beta cell; gonad; hypothalamus; prefrontal cortex; Brodmann area 9; gallbladder; cingulate gyrus; ganglionic eminence; anterior cingulate cortex; right frontal lobe / Top expressed in: lumbar spinal ganglion; mammillary body; ventromedial nucleus; ventral tegmental area; dorsomedial hypothalamic nucleus; trigeminal ganglion; habenula; central gray substance of midbrain; primary visual cortex; superior frontal gyrus; More reference expression data
BioGPS	More reference expression data
Gene ontology
Molecular function	pituitary adenylate cyclase activating polypeptide activity; hormone activity; peptide hormone receptor binding; protein binding; pituitary adenylate cyclase-activating polypeptide receptor binding; neuropeptide hormone activity; signaling receptor binding
Cellular component	intracellular anatomical structure; extracellular region; terminal bouton; extracellular space; neuron projection; perikaryon; cell body fiber
Biological process	histamine secretion; pituitary gland development; regulation of G protein-coupled receptor signaling pathway; negative regulation of glial cell proliferation; female pregnancy; cell-cell signaling; negative regulation of cell cycle; negative regulation of muscle cell apoptotic process; behavioral fear response; nervous system development; activation of adenylate cyclase activity; regulation of protein localization; positive regulation of GTPase activity; ATP metabolic process; negative regulation of acute inflammatory response to non-antigenic stimulus; regulation of oligodendrocyte progenitor proliferation; cellular response to glucocorticoid stimulus; positive regulation of gene expression; negative regulation of GTPase activity; positive regulation of synaptic transmission, glutamatergic; positive regulation of chemokine (C-C motif) ligand 5 production; regulation of postsynaptic membrane potential; positive regulation of cell population proliferation; negative regulation of potassium ion transport; positive regulation of ERK1 and ERK2 cascade; positive regulation of interleukin-6 production; positive regulation of neuron projection development; response to starvation; ovarian follicle development; sensory perception of pain; response to ethanol; negative regulation of acute inflammatory response to antigenic stimulus; neuropeptide signaling pathway; neuron projection development; cAMP-mediated signaling; positive regulation of somatostatin secretion; positive regulation of transcription by RNA polymerase II; positive regulation of protein kinase activity; regulation of protein phosphorylation; positive regulation of cytosolic calcium ion concentration; insulin secretion; positive regulation of growth hormone secretion; regulation of signaling receptor activity; G protein-coupled receptor signaling pathway; adenylate cyclase-activating G protein-coupled receptor signaling pathway; positive regulation of cAMP-mediated signaling; brain development; camera-type eye development; positive regulation of cold-induced thermogenesis
Sources:Amigo / QuickGO
Orthologs
Databases	NCBI: entry; OMA: entry
Species	Human	Mouse
Entrez	116	11516
Ensembl	ENSG00000141433	ENSMUSG00000024256
UniProt	P18509	O70176
RefSeq (mRNA)	NM_001099733; NM_001117	NM_009625; NM_001315503; NM_001315504
RefSeq (protein)	NP_001093203; NP_001108	NP_001302432; NP_001302433; NP_033755
Location (UCSC)	Chr 18: 0.9 – 0.91 Mb	Chr 17: 93.51 – 93.51 Mb
PubMed search
- Wikidata
View/Edit Human	View/Edit Mouse

Pituitary adenylate cyclase-activating polypeptide, also known as PACAP, is a protein that in humans is encoded by the ADCYAP1 gene. PACAP is similar to vasoactive intestinal peptide. One of its effects is to stimulate enterochromaffin-like cells. It binds to the vasoactive intestinal peptide receptor and the PACAP receptor.

== Function ==
This gene encodes adenylate cyclase-activating polypeptide 1. Mediated by adenylate cyclase-activating polypeptide 1 receptors, this polypeptide stimulates adenylate cyclase and subsequently increases the cAMP level in target cells. Adenylate cyclase-activating polypeptide 1 is not only a hypophysiotropic hormone (i.e. a substance that induces activity in the hypophysis), but also functions as a neurotransmitter and neuromodulator. In addition, it plays a role in paracrine and autocrine regulation of certain types of cells. This gene has five exons. Exons 1 and 2 encode the 5' UTR and signal peptide, respectively; exon 4 encodes an adenylate cyclase-activating polypeptide 1-related peptide; and exon 5 encodes the mature peptide and 3' UTR. This gene encodes three different mature peptides, including two isotypes: a shorter form and a longer form.

A version of this gene has been associated with post-traumatic stress disorder (PTSD) in women (but not men). This disorder involves a maladaptive psychological response to traumatic, i.e. existence-threatening, events. Ressler et al. identified an association of a SNP in the gene coding for pituitary adenylate cyclase-activating polypeptide (PACAP), implicating this peptide and its receptor (PAC1) in PTSD. In mouse model of heavy alcohol drinking, PACAP seems to mediate alcohol effects on bed nucleus of the stria terminalis.

=== Headache Disorders ===
Both isoforms of PACAP (PACAP-38 and PACAP-27) have been implicated in migraine pathogenesis. A Danish research group led by Dr. Messoud Ashina found that intravenous infusion of PACAP-38 induced migraine attacks in 58% of people with migraine, whilst the corresponding migraine induction rate was 55% for PACAP-27. Treatments with monoclonal antibodies have been investigated to target PACAP or its receptors for the treatment of primary headache disorders. In a phase 2, proof of concept study published in 2024, a monoclonal antibody treatment targeting PACAP (denoted Lu AG09222) reduced the number of migraine days in patients suffering from treatment-resistant migraines. Attempts to target its receptors have been less successful. Amgen's AMG-301, which targets the PAC1 receptor, failed to show greater efficacy than placebo in phase II trials.

=== Neuroprotective ===
PACAP has also been shown to be neuroprotective, though its tendency to induce migraines has limited clinical use of this property.

== Interactions ==
Pituitary adenylate cyclase-activating peptide has been shown to interact with the secretin receptor (with low affinity), as well as MRGPRX2 and GPR55.

== See also ==
- Adenylate cyclase
- Pituitary gland
