= Messoud Ashina =

Danish-Azerbaijani neuroscientist

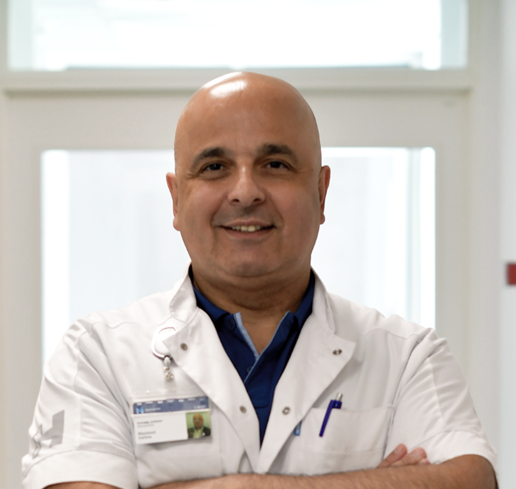
- Born: 29 December 1965; Baku, Azerbaijan
- Education: University of Copenhagen, Azerbaijan Medical University
- Medical career
- Profession: Neurologist
- Institutions: University of Copenhagen; Rigshospitalet
- Awards: Roche Prize for Scientific Achievements in Neurology, GlaxoSmithKline Research Prize, Mogens Fog Prize, Monrad-Krohns Prize; TÜBA Academy Prize; KFJ Prize

Messoud Ashina (born December 29, 1965) is a Danish-Azerbaijani neurologist and neuroscientist. He is currently Professor of Neurology at the University of Copenhagen and Senior Consultant of Neurology at Copenhagen University Hospital - Rigshospitalet. He is the Director of both the Center for Discoveries in Migraine, Copenhagen University Hospital - Rigshospitalet, and Director of the Danish National Knowledge Center on Headache Disorders. Ashina is also Past President of the International Headache Society. As of 2024, Ashina is ranked as the world's leading expert on headache disorders by Expertscape.

== Education ==
Ashina earned his medical degree at the age 22 from Azerbaijan Medical University in 1988. He later received his PhD and D.M.Sc. degrees at University of Copenhagen and completed his residency in neurology at Copenhagen University Hospitalet - Rigshospitalet.

== Personal life ==
Messoud Ashina was born on December 29, 1965, in Baku, Azerbaijan. His father, Rustam Ashina was an architect, while his mother, Nelli Hajiyeva, is a retired biologist. His brother, Sait Ashina, is an Associate Professor of Neurology at Harvard Medical School.

He lives in Copenhagen and is married to Camilla Ashina who is a dentist. They have two children, Hakan and Sara. His son, Hakan Ashina, is a Senior Scientist at Copenhagen University Hospital - Rigshospitalet and an Associate Professor of Neurology at the Technical University of Denmark.

== Research ==
Ashina is an acclaimed neuroscientist and considered one of the most prolific contributors to headache sciences. His academic works focus on migraine, which is a ubiquitous neurological disorder that affects more than one billion people worldwide. Ashina and his research lab have been key figures in the development and refinement of human provocation models that can be used to map signaling pathways underlying migraine pathogenesis and to identify novel drug targets. In these provocation models, endogenous signaling molecules or other hypothesized 'trigger' agents are used to induce migraine attacks in people with migraine, whereas healthy volunteers most often develop no more than a mild headache.

In his early work, Ashina and colleagues discovered that intravenous infusion of pituitary adenylate cyclase-activating polypeptide-38 (PACAP-38) induced migraine attacks in people with migraine. He then showed that PACAP infusion caused migraine attacks accompanied by a long-lasting dilation of cranial blood vessels. This contrasted findings using the closely related vasoactive intestinal polypeptide (VIP), which elicited mild headache (but not migraine) and only a short-lasting vasodilation. Upon extending the infusion duration of VIP, Ashina discovered that VIP now induced migraine attacks accompanied by long-lasting vasodilation. This led to the hypothesis that prolonged dilation of cranial arteries might contribute to the pathogenesis of migraine and other headache disorders. Of note, promising phase II trial results have been announced on the effectiveness of a PACAP-targeted drug for migraine prevention.

Ashina has, in addition to PACAP and VIP, identified other peptidergic drug targets for migraine and related headache disorders. These include adrenomedullin, amylin, and specific prostaglandins; all of which have been shown to induce migraine attacks in people with migraine. Efforts are ongoing for developing novel drugs directed against the signaling of these migraine-inducing peptides.

Ashina has also posited that accumulation of intracellular cyclic adenosine monophosphate (cAMP) must play an important role in migraine pathogenesis because the intracellular effects of PACAP receptor-binding are mediated by cAMP-dependent signaling pathways. This was confirmed by Ashina's lab when oral administration of cilostazol - a blocker of cAMP degradation - induced migraine attacks in people with migraine without aura. Ashina later hypothesized that downstream effects of cAMP-mediated migraine attacks were likely to involve opening of potassium channels. This hypothesis has been supported by experimental data from provocation studies, in which Ashina and colleagues demonstrated that openers of adenosine-triphosphate (ATP)-sensitive potassium channels and large conductance calcium-activated potassium channels induced migraine attacks in people with migraine without aura. Furthermore, Ashina and colleagues have also found that intravenous infusion of an ATP-sensitive potassium channel opener appears to be a potent inducer of migraine attacks with aura in people with migraine with aura.

== Publications ==
Ashina has authored over 450 papers, abstracts and book chapters, including more than 400 peer-reviewed publications in PubMed (1997-2025). He is the editor of the book 'Pathophysiology of Headaches'. His overall citation index is 33,048 (22,300 since 2020), and he has an H-index of 94 (72 since 2020).
