= Secretin =

Hormone involved in stomach, pancreas and liver secretions

SCT

Identifiers
- Aliases: SCT, entrez:6343, secretin
- External IDs: OMIM: 182099; MGI: 99466; GeneCards: SCT

Gene location (Human)
| Chr. | Chromosome 11 (human) |
| Band | 11p15.5 | Start | 626,309 bp |
| Band | 11p15.5 | End | 627,181 bp |

Gene location (Mouse)
| Chr. | Chromosome 7 (mouse) |
| Band | 7|7 F5 | Start | 140,858,243 bp |
| Band | 7|7 F5 | End | 140,859,046 bp |
RNA expression pattern
| Bgee | Human / Mouse (ortholog); Top expressed in: duodenum; granulocyte; gastrocnemius muscle; mucosa of transverse colon; muscle of thigh; gonad; sural nerve; monocyte; skeletal muscle tissue; spleen / Top expressed in: Ileal epithelium; perirhinal cortex; entorhinal cortex; choroid plexus of fourth ventricle; CA3 field; migratory enteric neural crest cell; decidua; duodenum; gastrula; jejunum; More reference expression data |
| BioGPS | n/a |
Gene ontology
| Molecular function | hormone activity; G protein-coupled receptor binding; signaling receptor binding; protein N-terminus binding; digestive hormone activity |
| Cellular component | extracellular region; extracellular space; cellular component |
| Biological process | brain development; negative regulation of gastrin-induced gastric acid secretion; pancreatic juice secretion; embryonic digestive tract development; positive regulation of somatostatin secretion; positive regulation of pancreatic juice secretion; regulation of signaling receptor activity; G protein-coupled receptor signaling pathway; positive regulation of cAMP-mediated signaling; diet induced thermogenesis; cellular water homeostasis; hippocampus development; response to nutrient levels; regulation of appetite; regulation of synaptic plasticity; positive regulation of lipid catabolic process |
Sources:Amigo / QuickGO
Orthologs
| Databases | NCBI: entry; OMA: entry |
| Species | Human | Mouse |
| Entrez | 6343 | 20287 |
| Ensembl | ENSG00000070031; ENSG00000274473 | ENSMUSG00000038580 |
| UniProt | P09683 | Q08535 |
| RefSeq (mRNA) | NM_021920 | NM_011328; NM_001287171; NM_001309439 |
| RefSeq (protein) | NP_068739 | NP_001274100; NP_001296368; NP_035458 |
| Location (UCSC) | Chr 11: 0.63 – 0.63 Mb | Chr 7: 140.86 – 140.86 Mb |
| PubMed search |
- Wikidata
| View/Edit Human | View/Edit Mouse |

Secretin is a hormone that regulates water homeostasis throughout the body and influences the environment of the duodenum by regulating secretions in the stomach, pancreas, and liver. It is a peptide hormone produced in the S cells of the duodenum, which are located in the intestinal glands. In humans, the secretin peptide is encoded by the SCT gene.

Secretin helps regulate the pH of the duodenum by inhibiting the secretion of gastric acid from the parietal cells of the stomach and stimulating the production of bicarbonate from the ductal cells of the pancreas. It also stimulates the secretion of bicarbonate and water by cholangiocytes in the bile duct, protecting it from bile acids by controlling the pH and promoting the flow in the duct. Meanwhile, in concert with secretin's actions, the other main hormone simultaneously issued by the duodenum, cholecystokinin (CCK), stimulates the gallbladder to contract, delivering its stored bile.

Prosecretin is a precursor to secretin, which is present in digestion. Secretin is stored in this unusable form, and is activated by gastric acid. This indirectly results in the neutralisation of duodenal pH, thus ensuring no damage is done to the small intestine by the aforementioned acid.

In 2007, secretin was discovered to play a role in osmoregulation by acting on the hypothalamus, pituitary gland, and kidney.

== History ==
In 1902, William Bayliss and Ernest Starling were studying how the nervous system controls the process of digestion. It was known that the pancreas secreted digestive juices in response to the passage of food (chyme) through the pyloric sphincter into the duodenum. They discovered (by cutting all the nerves to the pancreas in their experimental animals) that this process was not, in fact, governed by the nervous system. They determined that a substance secreted by the intestinal lining stimulates the pancreas after being transported via the bloodstream. They named this intestinal secretion secretin. This type of 'chemical messenger' substance is now called a hormone, a term coined by Starling in 1905.

Secretin is frequently erroneously stated to have been the first hormone identified. However, British researchers George Oliver and Edward Albert Schäfer had already published their findings of an adrenal extract increasing blood pressure and heart rate in brief reports in 1894 and a full publication in 1895, making adrenaline the first discovered hormone.

== Structure ==
Secretin is initially synthesized as a 120 amino acid precursor protein known as prosecretin. This precursor contains an N-terminal signal peptide, spacer, secretin itself (residues 28–54), and a 72-amino acid C-terminal peptide.

The mature secretin peptide is a linear peptide hormone, which is composed of 27 amino acids and has a molecular weight of 3055. A helix is formed in the amino acids between positions 5 and 13. The amino acids sequences of secretin have some similarities to that of glucagon, vasoactive intestinal peptide (VIP), and gastric inhibitory peptide (GIP). Fourteen of 27 amino acids of secretin reside in the same positions as in glucagon, 7 the same as in VIP, and 10 the same as in GIP.

Secretin also has an amidated carboxyl-terminal amino acid which is valine. The sequence of amino acids in secretin is H–His-Ser-Asp-Gly-Thr-Phe-Thr-Ser-Glu-Leu-Ser-Arg-Leu-Arg-Asp-Ser-Ala-Arg-Leu-Gln-Arg-Leu-Leu-Gln-Gly-Leu-Val–NH_{2}.

== Physiology ==
=== Production and secretion ===
Secretin is synthesized in cytoplasmic secretory granules of S cells, which are found mainly in the mucosa of the duodenum, and in smaller numbers in the jejunum of the small intestine.

Secretin is released into circulation and/or intestinal lumen in response to low duodenal pH that ranges between 2 and 4.5 depending on species; the acidity is due to hydrochloric acid in the chyme that enters the duodenum from the stomach via the pyloric sphincter. Also, the secretion of secretin is increased by the products of protein digestion bathing the mucosa of the upper small intestine.

Secretin release is inhibited by H_{2} antagonists, which reduce gastric acid secretion. As a result, if the pH in the duodenum increases above 4.5, secretin cannot be released.

=== Function ===
==== pH regulation ====
Secretin primarily functions to neutralize the pH in the duodenum, allowing digestive enzymes from the pancreas (e.g., pancreatic amylase and pancreatic lipase) to function optimally.

Secretin targets the pancreas; pancreatic centroacinar cells have secretin receptors in their plasma membrane. As secretin binds to these receptors, it stimulates adenylate cyclase activity and converts ATP to cyclic AMP. Cyclic AMP acts as second messenger in intracellular signal transduction and causes the organ to secrete a bicarbonate-rich fluid that flows into the intestine. Bicarbonate is a base that neutralizes the acid, thus establishing a pH favorable to the action of other digestive enzymes in the small intestine.

Secretin also increases water and bicarbonate secretion from duodenal Brunner's glands to buffer the incoming protons of the acidic chyme, and also reduces acid secretion by parietal cells of the stomach. It does this through at least three mechanisms: 1) By stimulating release of somatostatin, 2) By inhibiting release of gastrin in the pyloric antrum, and 3) By direct downregulation of the parietal cell acid secretory mechanics.

It counteracts blood glucose concentration spikes by triggering increased insulin release from pancreas, following oral glucose intake.

==== Osmoregulation ====
Secretin modulates water and electrolyte transport in pancreatic duct cells, liver cholangiocytes, and epididymis epithelial cells. It is found to play a role in the vasopressin-independent regulation of renal water reabsorption.

Secretin is found in the magnocellular neurons of the paraventricular and supraoptic nuclei of the hypothalamus and along the neurohypophysial tract to neurohypophysis. During increased osmolality, it is released from the posterior pituitary. In the hypothalamus, it activates vasopressin release. It is also needed to carry out the central effects of angiotensin II. In the absence of secretin or its receptor in the gene knockout animals, central injection of angiotensin II was unable to stimulate water intake and vasopressin release.

It has been suggested that abnormalities in such secretin release could explain the abnormalities underlying type D syndrome of inappropriate antidiuretic hormone hypersecretion (SIADH). In these individuals, vasopressin release and response are normal, although abnormal renal expression, translocation of aquaporin 2, or both are found. It has been suggested that "Secretin as a neurosecretory hormone from the posterior pituitary, therefore, could be the long-sought vasopressin independent mechanism to solve the riddle that has puzzled clinicians and physiologists for decades."

==== Food intake ====
Secretin and its receptor are found in discrete nuclei of the hypothalamus, including the paraventricular nucleus and the arcuate nucleus, which are the primary brain sites for regulating body energy homeostasis. It was found that both central and peripheral injection of Sct reduce food intake in mouse, indicating an anorectic role of the peptide. This function of the peptide is mediated by the central melanocortin system.

== Uses ==
Secretin is used in diagnostic tests for pancreatic function; secretin is injected and the pancreatic output can then be imaged with magnetic resonance imaging, a noninvasive procedure, or secretions generated as a result can gathered either through an endoscope or through tubes inserted through the mouth, down into the duodenum.

A recombinant human secretin has been available since 2004 for these diagnostic purposes. There were problems with the availability of this agent from 2012 to 2015.

== Research ==
A wave of enthusiasm for secretin as a possible treatment for autism arose in the 1990s based on a hypothetical gut-brain connection; as a result the NIH ran a series of clinical trials that showed that secretin was not effective, which brought an end to popular interest.

A high-affinity and optimized secretin receptor antagonist (Y10,c[E16,K20],I17,Cha22,R25)sec(6-27) has been designed and developed which has allowed the structural characterization of secreting inactive conformation.

== See also ==
- Secretin family
- Secretin receptor
