= Etiometry =

Medical Device company based in Boston

Etiometry Inc
- Company type: Privately held company
- Industry: Medical Device
- Founded: 2010
- Founder: Jesse Lock, MD, Dimitar Baronov and Evan Butler
- Headquarters: Boston, MA
- Area served: Worldwide
- Key people: Dimitar Baronov, Evan Butler and Shane Cooke
- Products: Etiometry platform
- Number of employees: 50+
- Website: https://www.etiometry.com/

Etiometry, Inc. is an American medical technology company based in Boston, Massachusetts, founded in 2010. It develops the Etiometry Platform (also known as the T3 Platform), a regulated medical device software system for intensive care units (ICUs). According to product documentation, the platform aggregates real-time physiologic data and employs risk analytics to help clinicians identify early signs of deterioration in pediatric and adult critical care settings. It has received FDA 510(k) clearances, CE marking under EU Medical Device Regulation (MDR), and Health Canada licensing. Peer-reviewed publications have assessed the platform's clinical utility as a clinical decision support system, and published case studies have documented its use in academic intensive care units.

== History ==
Etiometry was founded by Dimitar Baronov, Evan Butler, and Jesse Lock, drawing from collaborations between Boston Children's Hospital and Boston University. The founders applied aerospace engineering principles to ICU data modeling, leading to the creation of the initial T3 platform. Early pilots at Boston Children's and The Hospital for Sick Children (Toronto) informed the platform's design before its commercialization in 2014.

The first FDA 510(k) clearance was secured in March 2015 for the core data visualization module. Later clearances covered advanced risk indices: the IDO2(Inadequate Oxygen Delivery Index) (2016) and IVCO2 (Inadequate Ventilation of CO2) (2019). On February 12, 2025, Etiometry obtained its tenth clearance (510(k) K241479), which combined four indices (IDO2, IVCO2, ACD, and HLA) with cybersecurity compliant with FDA Section 524B, as reported in independent industry media. A further clearance was obtained on April 3, 2026 (510(k) K254066) for the Etiometry Platform under the Special 510(k) pathway.

== Platform Technology ==
The Etiometry Platform combines Data Aggregation and Visualization to integrate continuous data from bedside devices and laboratory systems into a time-sequenced dashboard for clinicians.

Risk Analytics Engine (RAE) computes real-time risk indices using Bayesian models:

- IDO2 (Inadequate Oxygen Delivery)
- IVCO2 (Inadequate CO_{2} Ventilation)
- ACD
- HLA

According to product documentation and published studies, the platform supports local and remote ICU monitoring.

== Independent Clinical Studies ==
The following published studies have explored the platform's potential role in supporting clinical decision-making in critical care settings.

- IDO2 and Vasoactive Weaning: Critical Care Explorations (2021) multicenter study of over 3,000 pediatric cardiac surgery patients found that high IDO2 was associated with vasoactive drug weaning failure (OR ≈ 4, p < 0.001).
- Extubation Failure: A 2025 cohort study in Pediatric Critical Care Medicine reported that elevated IDO2 and IVCO2 before extubation were associated with increased risk of failure in neonates post-congenital heart surgery (OR ≈ 1.8, p < 0.05).
- Resource Utilization: Observational study at a hospital in Alabama was associated with a reduction in the length of ICU stay and ventilation duration following platform integration.
- Decrease in Duration of Vasoactive Infusions: In a multicenter before-and-after study conducted between June 1, 2020, and December 31, 2022, the platform, was shown to significantly decreased vasoactive infusions duration.

== Regulatory Approvals and Certifications ==
Authority / Standard	Region	Details
FDA 510(k) (K241479)	USA	Ten clearances 2015–2025, including 2025 submission that added four analytic indices and cybersecurity improvements under FDA guidance Section 524B.
CE Mark (Class IIa, MDR)	EU	Certified for pediatric and adult ICU monitoring under EU MDR.
Health Canada MDL	Canada	Licensed as a Class III medical device; maintained through MDSAP audit.
ANVISA Registration	Brazil	Registered Class II medical device via MDSAP pathways.
ISO 13485:2016	Global	Certified medical device QMS via MDSAP registry.
MDSAP	Global	Verified audit covering FDA, Health Canada, ANVISA.
ISO/IEC 27001	Global	Certified information security management system.
SOC 2 Type II	USA	Independent audit of security controls.
HIPAA	USA	The platform is designed to satisfy HIPAA requirements.
FDA Section 524B Cybersecurity	USA	2025 clearance aligned with updated cybersecurity rules.

== Adoption and Clinical Use ==
According to published reports, the platform has been implemented in hospitals in North America, Europe and Asia. Published use cases include cardiac output monitoring post-surgery, extubation decision support, remote ICU monitoring, and automation of hospital-defined protocols for workflows such as breathing trials. The platform archives high-frequency patient data, which has been used in retrospective research and internal model development.
