= ADCYAP1R1 =

Protein-coding gene in the species Homo sapiens

Identifiers
- Aliases: ADCYAP1R1, PAC1, PAC1R, PACAPR, PACAPRI, ADCYAP receptor type I
- External IDs: OMIM: 102981; MGI: 108449; GeneCards: ADCYAP1R1
Available structures
PDB	Ortholog search: PDBe RCSB
PDB	List of PDB id codes 2JOD

Gene location (Human)
Chr.	Chromosome 7 (human)
Band	7p14.3	Start	31,052,308 bp
Band	7p14.3	End	31,111,479 bp

Gene location (Mouse)
Chr.	Chromosome 6 (mouse)
Band	6|6 B3	Start	55,428,963 bp
Band	6|6 B3	End	55,478,436 bp
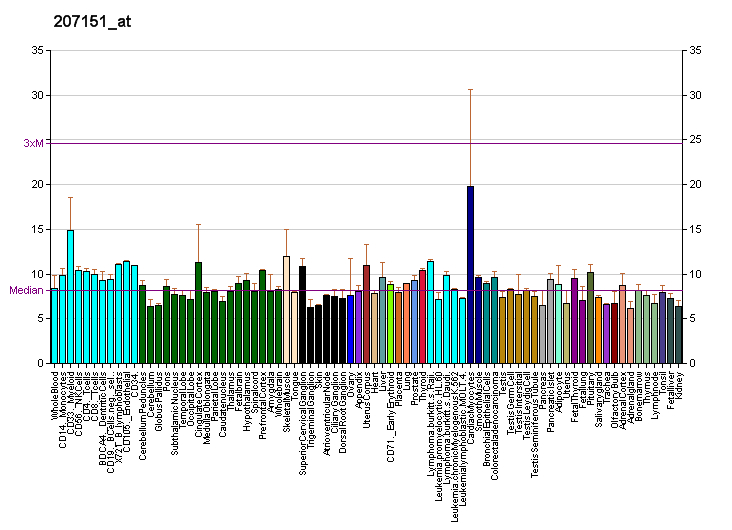
RNA expression pattern
Bgee	Human / Mouse (ortholog); Top expressed in: ganglionic eminence; nucleus accumbens; caudate nucleus; amygdala; entorhinal cortex; right frontal lobe; internal globus pallidus; cingulate gyrus; anterior cingulate cortex; right hemisphere of cerebellum / Top expressed in: paraventricular nucleus of hypothalamus; dentate gyrus of hippocampal formation granule cell; arcuate nucleus; lateral septal nucleus; Rostral migratory stream; dorsomedial hypothalamic nucleus; ventral tegmental area; substantia nigra; lateral hypothalamus; ventromedial nucleus; More reference expression data
BioGPS	More reference expression data
Gene ontology
Molecular function	G protein-coupled receptor activity; adenylate cyclase binding; neuropeptide binding; vasoactive intestinal polypeptide receptor activity; signal transducer activity; protein binding; transmembrane signaling receptor activity; signaling receptor activity; G protein-coupled peptide receptor activity; peptide hormone binding
Cellular component	cytoplasm; integral component of membrane; endosome; rough endoplasmic reticulum; membrane; bicellular tight junction; receptor complex; plasma membrane; integral component of plasma membrane; cell surface; caveola; neuron projection; intracellular membrane-bounded organelle
Biological process	cell differentiation; multicellular organismal response to stress; response to estradiol; positive regulation of calcium ion transport into cytosol; positive regulation of inositol phosphate biosynthetic process; negative regulation of cell death; activation of phospholipase C activity; multicellular organism development; cell surface receptor signaling pathway; development of primary female sexual characteristics; spermatogenesis; response to ethanol; cAMP-mediated signaling; signal transduction; positive regulation of small GTPase mediated signal transduction; G protein-coupled receptor signaling pathway; positive regulation of cAMP-mediated signaling
Sources:Amigo / QuickGO
Orthologs
Databases	NCBI: entry; OMA: entry
Species	Human	Mouse
Entrez	117	11517
Ensembl	ENSG00000078549	ENSMUSG00000029778
UniProt	P41586	P70205
RefSeq (mRNA)	NM_001118; NM_001199635; NM_001199636; NM_001199637	NM_001025372; NM_007407
RefSeq (protein)	NP_001109; NP_001186564; NP_001186565; NP_001186566	NP_001020543; NP_031433
Location (UCSC)	Chr 7: 31.05 – 31.11 Mb	Chr 6: 55.43 – 55.48 Mb
PubMed search
- Wikidata
View/Edit Human	View/Edit Mouse

Pituitary adenylate cyclase-activating polypeptide type I receptor also known as PAC_{1}, is a protein that in humans is encoded by the ADCYAP1R1 gene. This receptor binds pituitary adenylate cyclase activating peptide.

== Function ==
PAC_{1} is a membrane-associated protein and shares significant homology with members of the G-protein coupled class B glucagon/secretin receptor family. This receptor mediates diverse biological actions of adenylate cyclase activating polypeptide 1 and is positively coupled to adenylate cyclase. Alternative splicing of two exons of this gene generates four major splice variants, but their full-length nature has not been determined. PAC_{1} is expressed in the adrenal medulla, pancreatic acini, uterus, myenteric plexus and brain. It is also expressed in the trigeminal, otic and superior cervical ganglia (prejunctional) and cerebral arteries (postjunctional).

== Ligands ==
Agonists

- PACAP-38 (endogenous peptide agonist, full length version) - also activates other receptors VIP, GPR55 and MRGPRX2 and the Secretin receptor.
- PACAP-27 (endogenous peptide agonist, shorter fragment which retains activity)

Antagonists

- PACAP(6-38) - N-terminal truncated version of the endogenous peptide agonist which acts as a potent PAC1 antagonist
- BAY 2686013
- PA-915
