= Pseudoallergy =

- Other names: Nonallergic hypersensitivity
- Specialty: Dermatology, Rheumatology, Internal medicine
- Causes: Direct mast cell activation through non-IgE receptors

Pseudoallergy, sometimes known as nonallergic hypersensitivity, is a type of hypersensitivity reaction mostly described in the context of drug allergy. The mechanism is somewhat similar to the type 1 hypersensitivity in the Gell and Coombs classification in that the effector cell is also mast cell. In pseudoallergic reaction, the mast cell is directly activated, rather than through the mediation of Immunoglobulin E (IgE). Therefore, it is also known as direct mast cell activation.

Aspirin and other nonsteroidal anti-inflammatory drugs (NSAIDs), along with certain food ingredients and additives like tartrazine, benzoates, and salicylates, are the most common causes of pseudoallergic reactions. Since these reactions don't require IgE sensitization, they may manifest themselves after only one exposure. Doses-dependent, pseudoallergic reactions typically involve substances that are chemically unrelated to each other.

The lack of information in skin tests and serology makes the diagnosis challenging. Nonallergic hypersensitivity is diagnosed on the basis of symptoms. Oral challenge tests can be used to confirm pseudoallergy in the proper clinical context, i.e. a person consumes progressively larger quantities of a suspected allergen under medical supervision.

== Signs and symptoms ==
Clinically, pseudoallergy and anaphylaxis are identical. Pseudoallergy symptoms include gastrointestinal symptoms, urticaria, bronchospasm, and angioedema, along with headache, edema, skin flushing, hypotension, and shock.

== Causes ==
Although they are commonly used to treat pain related to fractures, opioid medications have well-known side effects. Almost all opioids have the ability to directly induce mast cell degranulation, which in turn can result in pseudoallergy. Opioid medications, including morphine, codeine, and meperidine, have been known to cause pseudoallergy. By directly activating mast cells, opioids cause histamine release, which results in flushing or pruritus that is almost always mistaken for allergy symptoms. Compared to other opioids, codeine and morphine have been shown to be more likely to cause mast cell degranulation. By using a non-immunologic mechanism that is not dependent on IgE or the high-affinity IgE receptor FcεRI, codeine causes pseudoallergy. This suggests that codeine may activate mast cell degranulation by acting on the opioid receptor.

== Mechanism ==
One recognized mechanism is through the activation of mast cell receptor Mas-Related G Protein-Coupled Receptor-X2 (MRGPRX2). MRGPRX2 is a G protein-coupled receptor capable of recognizing both endogenous and exogenous stimuli, therefore activating the degranulation of mast cell, results in pseudoallergic reaction. MRGPRX2 is expressed in mast cells (particularly connective tissue mast cells [MC_{TC}] found in the skin), sensory neurons, and keratinocytes. Comparing to type 1 hypersensitivity, MRGPRX2-mediated response is more rapid and transient. It is proposed that single nucleotide polymorphism of this receptor may results in different reaction among individuals, although clinical significance is undertermined.

Other mechanisms results in direct mast cell activation are suggested, including complement receptors (CR3, CR4, CR3a, CR5a) activated by the respective complement factors; toll-like receptors activated by bacterial lipopolysaccharide or peptidoglycan; surface IgE receptors (FcεRI, FcεRII) activated by autoantibodies or parasites; IgG receptors (FcγRII) activated by pathogen-specific IgG; Cysteinyl leukotriene receptors (CysLT1R/2R) activated by cysteinyl leukotrienes; Protease-activated receptors (PAR2) activated by other mast-cell proteases.

While pseudoallergy and IgE-mediated allergy share some similarities in their clinical manifestations, pseudoallergy is not the same as common allergy or type 1 reactions. Pseudoallergy can be caused by a variety of medications through various pathways. For example, taxol can cause pseudoallergy by stimulating the complement system. The reaction occurs for the first time without any prior sensitization.

== See also ==
- Anaphylaxis
- Type I hypersensitivity
