= PA-915 =

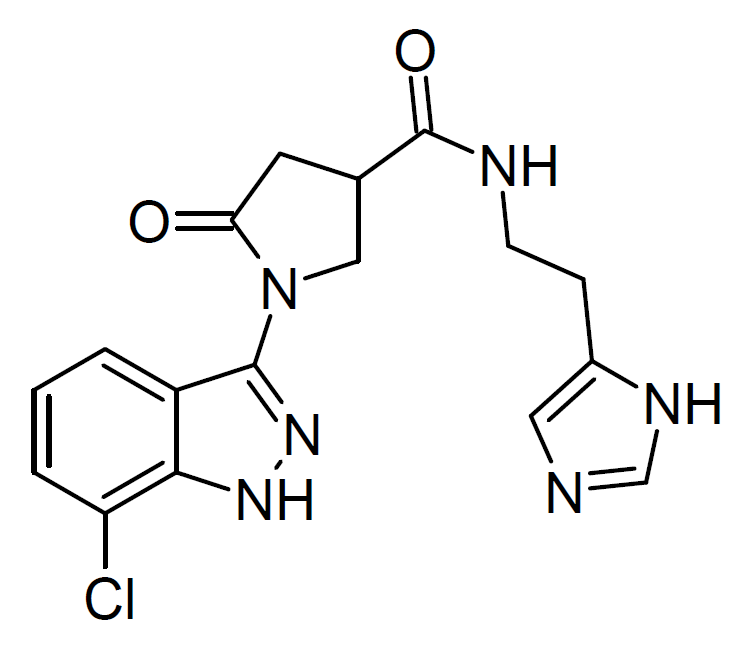

Identifiers
- IUPAC name: 1-(7-chloro-1H-indazol-3-yl)-N-[2-(1H-imidazol-5-yl)ethyl]-5-oxopyrrolidine-3-carboxamide
- CAS Number: 2305204-24-2
- PubChem CID: 142550469

Chemical and physical data
- Formula: C_{17}H_{17}ClN_{6}O_{2}
- Molar mass: 372.81 g·mol^{−1}
- 3D model (JSmol): Interactive image
- SMILES: C1C(CN(C1=O)C2=NNC3=C2C=CC=C3Cl)C(=O)NCCC4=CN=CN4
- InChI: InChI=1S/C17H17ClN6O2/c18-13-3-1-2-12-15(13)22-23-16(12)24-8-10(6-14(24)25)17(26)20-5-4-11-7-19-9-21-11/h1-3,7,9-10H,4-6,8H2,(H,19,21)(H,20,26)(H,22,23); Key:MCXQHNLGSHUYBL-UHFFFAOYSA-N

PA-915 is a drug used in scientific research which acts as a selective antagonist of the pituitary adenylate cyclase-activating polypeptide type I receptor (PAC1). In animal studies it has been found to prevent the development of allodynia and shows analgesic effects against neuropathic pain, and also shows antidepressant effects.

== See also ==
- BAY 2686013
