= BAIAP3 =

Protein-coding gene in the species Homo sapiens

Identifiers
- Aliases: BAIAP3, BAP3, BAI1 associated protein 3
- External IDs: OMIM: 604009; MGI: 2685783; GeneCards: BAIAP3

Gene location (Human)
Chr.	Chromosome 16 (human)
Band	16p13.3	Start	1,333,638 bp
Band	16p13.3	End	1,349,441 bp

Gene location (Mouse)
Chr.	Chromosome 17 (mouse)
Band	17|17 A3.3	Start	25,461,633 bp
Band	17|17 A3.3	End	25,475,338 bp
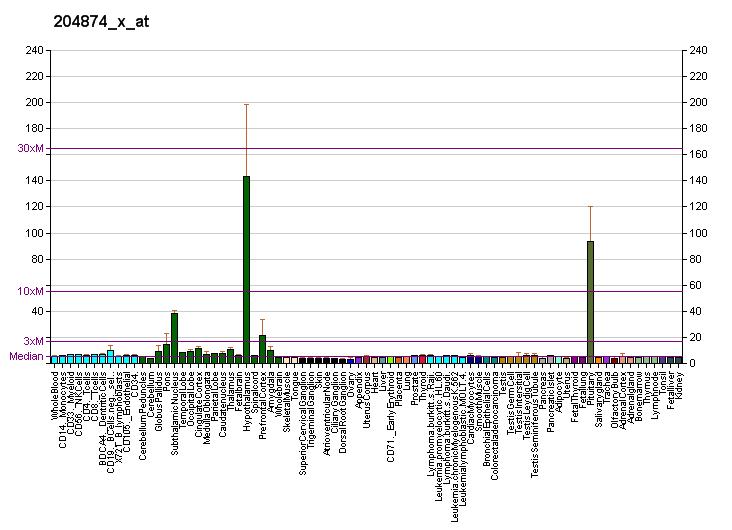

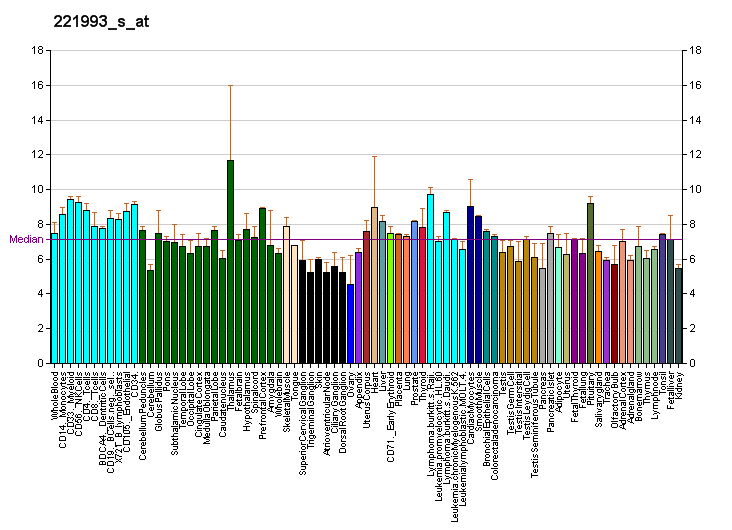

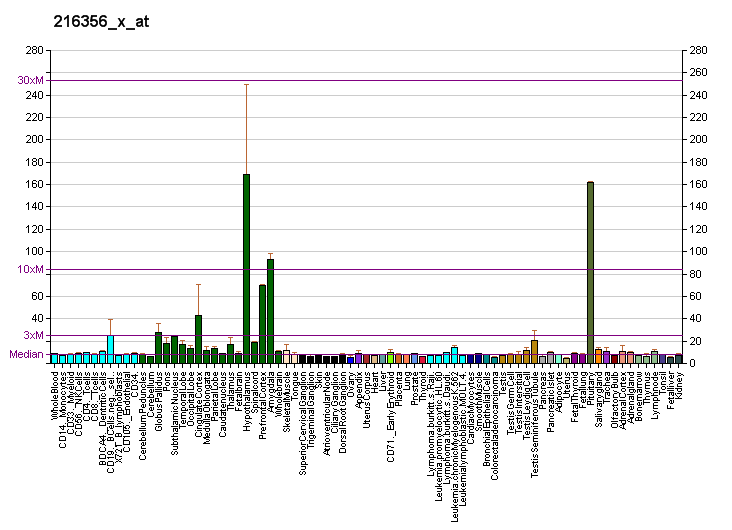
RNA expression pattern
Bgee	Human / Mouse (ortholog); Top expressed in: right uterine tube; anterior pituitary; right frontal lobe; Brodmann area 9; cingulate gyrus; anterior cingulate cortex; hypothalamus; amygdala; olfactory zone of nasal mucosa; prefrontal cortex / Top expressed in: arcuate nucleus; ventromedial nucleus; dorsomedial hypothalamic nucleus; median eminence; paraventricular nucleus of hypothalamus; suprachiasmatic nucleus; lateral hypothalamus; nucleus of stria terminalis; central gray substance of midbrain; ventral tegmental area; More reference expression data
BioGPS	More reference expression data
Gene ontology
Molecular function	syntaxin binding; SNARE binding; calcium ion binding; protein binding; phospholipid binding
Cellular component	presynapse; endoplasmic reticulum; dense core granule; early endosome membrane; cytosol; plasma membrane; late endosome membrane; trans-Golgi network membrane; recycling endosome membrane; cytoplasm; endosome; Golgi apparatus; membrane
Biological process	G protein-coupled receptor signaling pathway; dense core granule maturation; positive regulation of neurotransmitter secretion; regulation of synaptic transmission, GABAergic; positive regulation of insulin secretion involved in cellular response to glucose stimulus; retrograde transport, endosome to Golgi; regulation of dense core granule exocytosis; exocytosis
Sources:Amigo / QuickGO
Orthologs
Databases	NCBI: entry; OMA: entry
Species	Human	Mouse
Entrez	8938	545192
Ensembl	ENSG00000007516	ENSMUSG00000047507
UniProt	O94812	Q80TT2
RefSeq (mRNA)	NM_001199096; NM_001199097; NM_001199098; NM_001199099; NM_001286464 NM_003933	NM_001163270
RefSeq (protein)	NP_001186025; NP_001186026; NP_001186027; NP_001186028; NP_001273393 NP_003924	n/a
Location (UCSC)	Chr 16: 1.33 – 1.35 Mb	Chr 17: 25.46 – 25.48 Mb
PubMed search
- Wikidata
View/Edit Human	View/Edit Mouse

BAI1-associated protein 3 is a protein that in humans is encoded by the BAIAP3 gene.

BAIAP3 was identified as a protein-binding partner of BAI1. BAI1 is a p53-target gene that encodes a brain-specific angiogenesis inhibitor. The protein is a seven-span transmembrane protein and a member of the secretin receptor family. BAIAP3 interacts with the cytoplasmic region of brain-specific angiogenesis inhibitor 1. BAIAP3 also contains two C2 domains, which are often found in proteins involved in signal transduction or membrane trafficking. Its expression pattern and similarity to other proteins suggest that it may be involved in synaptic functions.

== Interactions ==
BAIAP3 has been shown to interact with Brain-specific angiogenesis inhibitor 1.
