= BAY 2686013 =

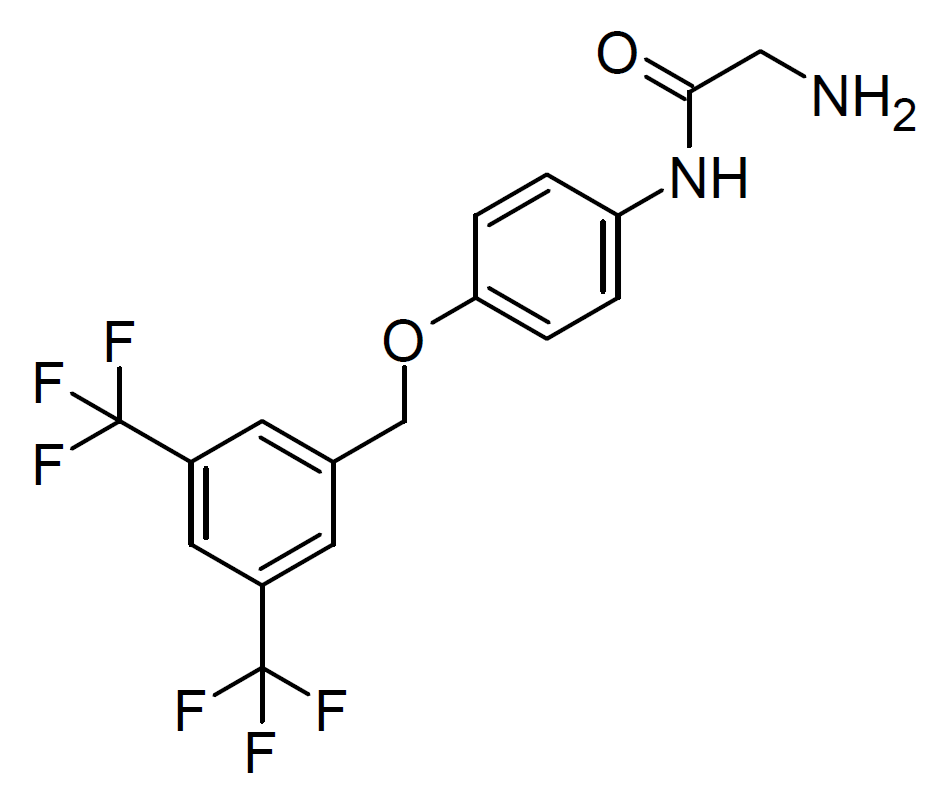

Identifiers
- IUPAC name: 2-amino-N-[4-[[3,5-bis(trifluoromethyl)phenyl]methoxy]phenyl]acetamide
- CAS Number: 3058853-08-7
- PubChem CID: 176472406

Chemical and physical data
- Formula: C_{17}H_{14}F_{6}N_{2}O_{2}
- Molar mass: 392.301 g·mol^{−1}
- 3D model (JSmol): Interactive image
- SMILES: C1=CC(=CC=C1NC(=O)CN)OCC2=CC(=CC(=C2)C(F)(F)F)C(F)(F)F
- InChI: InChI=1S/C17H14F6N2O2/c18-16(19,20)11-5-10(6-12(7-11)17(21,22)23)9-27-14-3-1-13(2-4-14)25-15(26)8-24/h1-7H,8-9,24H2,(H,25,26); Key:YHGBLECINAKBKX-UHFFFAOYSA-N

BAY 2686013 is a drug used in scientific research which acts as a selective antagonist of the pituitary adenylate cyclase-activating polypeptide type I receptor (PAC1) and is expected to be useful for characterizing the function of this receptor.

== See also ==
- PA-915
