= Adhesion G protein-coupled receptor B1 =

Protein-coding gene in the species Homo sapiens

ADGRB1

Identifiers
- Aliases: ADGRB1, BAI1, GDAIF, adhesion G protein-coupled receptor B1
- External IDs: OMIM: 602682; MGI: 1933736; GeneCards: ADGRB1

Gene location (Human)
Chr.	Chromosome 8 (human)
Band	8q24.3	Start	142,449,430 bp
Band	8q24.3	End	142,545,009 bp

Gene location (Mouse)
Chr.	Chromosome 15 (mouse)
Band	15|15 D3	Start	74,388,044 bp
Band	15|15 D3	End	74,461,314 bp
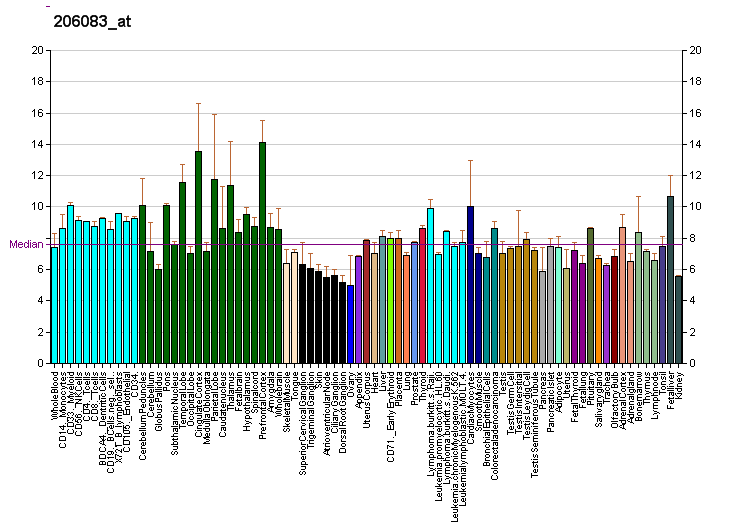
RNA expression pattern
Bgee	Human / Mouse (ortholog); Top expressed in: right frontal lobe; nucleus accumbens; cingulate gyrus; anterior cingulate cortex; amygdala; Brodmann area 9; caudate nucleus; putamen; prefrontal cortex; right hemisphere of cerebellum / Top expressed in: superior frontal gyrus; primary visual cortex; dentate gyrus of hippocampal formation granule cell; entorhinal cortex; perirhinal cortex; ventricular zone; neural layer of retina; CA3 field; cerebellar cortex; nucleus of stria terminalis; More reference expression data
BioGPS	More reference expression data
Gene ontology
Molecular function	G protein-coupled receptor activity; signal transducer activity; transmembrane signaling receptor activity; lipopolysaccharide binding; phosphatidylserine binding; PDZ domain binding; protein binding
Cellular component	integral component of membrane; integral component of plasma membrane; cell-cell junction; membrane; phagocytic cup; extracellular space; plasma membrane; focal adhesion; postsynaptic density; dendrite; perinuclear region of cytoplasm; extracellular region; cell junction; cell projection; dendritic spine; synapse; postsynaptic membrane
Biological process	G protein-coupled receptor signaling pathway; cell surface receptor signaling pathway; peripheral nervous system development; axonogenesis; signal transduction; negative regulation of cell population proliferation; positive regulation of synapse assembly; phagocytosis, recognition; phagocytosis, engulfment; negative regulation of endothelial cell migration; negative regulation of angiogenesis; negative regulation of protein ubiquitination; negative regulation of protein catabolic process; apoptotic cell clearance; engulfment of apoptotic cell; regulation of synaptic plasticity; defense response to Gram-negative bacterium; positive regulation of myoblast fusion; positive regulation of reactive oxygen species biosynthetic process; immune system process; phagocytosis; cell adhesion; nervous system development; muscle organ development; innate immune response; adenylate cyclase-activating G protein-coupled receptor signaling pathway
Sources:Amigo / QuickGO
Orthologs
Databases	NCBI: entry; OMA: entry
Species	Human	Mouse
Entrez	575	107831
Ensembl	ENSG00000181790	ENSMUSG00000034730
UniProt	O14514	Q3UHD1
RefSeq (mRNA)	NM_001702; NM_001391985; NM_001391986; NM_001391987; NM_001391988	NM_174991; NM_001359759
RefSeq (protein)	NP_001693	NP_778156; NP_001346688
Location (UCSC)	Chr 8: 142.45 – 142.55 Mb	Chr 15: 74.39 – 74.46 Mb
PubMed search
- Wikidata
View/Edit Human	View/Edit Mouse

Adhesion G protein-coupled receptor B1, also known as brain-specific angiogenesis inhibitor 1 (BAI1) is a protein that in humans is encoded by the ADGRB1 gene. It is a member of the adhesion-GPCR family of receptors.

== Function ==
Angiogenesis is controlled by a local balance between stimulators and inhibitors of new vessel growth and is suppressed under normal physiologic conditions. Angiogenesis has been shown to be essential for growth and metastasis of solid tumors. In order to obtain blood supply for their growth, tumor cells are potently angiogenic and attract new vessels as results of increased secretion of inducers and decreased production of endogenous negative regulators. BAI1 contains at least one 'functional' p53-binding site within an intron, and its expression has been shown to be induced by wildtype p53. There are two other brain-specific angiogenesis inhibitor genes, designated BAI2 and BAI3 which along with BAI1 have similar tissue specificities and structures, however only BAI1 is transcriptionally regulated by p53. BAI1 is postulated to be a member of the secretin receptor family, an inhibitor of angiogenesis and a growth suppressor of glioblastomas.

== Interactions ==
Brain-specific angiogenesis inhibitor 1 has been shown to interact with BAIAP3 and MAGI1.
