= S cell =

=== Location and Structure ===
S cell

Details
- Location: Jejunum and duodenum
- Function: Secretin secretion

Identifiers
- Latin: endocrinocytus S
- TH: H3.04.02.0.00037
- FMA: 62936

S cells or secretin cells are classically defined as enteroendocrine cells that release secretin. S cells are found most concentrated in the duodenum, though they exist throughout the intestinal epithelium, particularly within crypts of Lieberkühn. As with other differentiated intestinal enteroendocrine cells, S cells have a very short lifespan and must be continually replaced.

==== Secretin synthesis ====
Secretin is first synthesized as an inactive precursor called prosecretin, and then undergoes post translational proteolytic cleavage to become its active form. In humans, secretin is encoded by the SCT gene. Containing four exons, the protein coded section of the human SCT gene is 713bp long, and radiation mapping has located the gene to chromosome 11p15.5. Due to amino acid conservation, the SCT gene is structurally similar to secretin-encoding genes in other species. SCT transcription and translation produces prosecretin, the inactive precursor for secretin. Prosecretin is a one hundred twenty amino acid sequence with a seventy two amino acid C-terminal sequence that facilitates the proteolytic cleavage into the active form. Both prosecretin and secretin take on an alpha helical secondary structure faciliatated by hydrogen bonding, though the final function secretin molecule is only twenty seven amino acids.

As enteroendocrine cells, S cells are epithelial cells that possess cytoplasmic secretory granules where secretin is stored after being synthesized of the ribosomes of the rough endoplasmic reticulum. These specialized organelles formed in the trans-Golgi network allow for constant storage of secretin in the S cell. These vesicles are able to fuse with the cell membrane to release their contents such that secretin can be quickly secreted when necessary.

==== Development and differentiation ====
The digestive tract is formed from embryonic endoderm, and the differentiation of intestinal epithelial cells is a highly regulated process during embryonic development. S cells develop from the enteroendocrine differentiation pathway. During embryonic development, simultaneously with villi emergence, intestinal epithelial cells are differentiated into three groups: absorptive, secretory, and enteroendocrine. The differentiation of intestinal epithelial cells between these types is highly regulated, with a key regulation pathway being the NOTCH pathway of cellular signaling. A complex system of reciprocal regulation between Notch and other genetic factors moderates whether an intestinal epithelial cell will become absorptive or secretory, but a study conducted in rats found that inhibition of the Notch signaling pathway increases the differentiation of intestinal epithelial stem cells into secretory cells via relieving the Hes1-mediated repression of transcription factor Math1, and these secretory cells are able to thereafter differentiate into S cells.

=== Classification ===
The traditional classification of enteroendocrine cells identifies S cells as a distinct cell population that exclusively produces secretin, with secretin production considered unique to this cell type. However, recent single-cell studies have found that single enteroendocrine cells can secrete multiple different hormones, challenging the traditional one cell/one hormone classification. A 2024 study found secretin expression across several enteroendocrine populations and associated increased secretin expression with enteroendocrine cell maturation, positing that secretin production may be better described as a character of multiple mature enteroendocrine cells rather than one discrete cell population. Additionally, a 2020 study published in the International Journal of Obesity located S cells in the distal small intestine of both rats and humans. In rats, these S cells exhibited glucose-stimulated secretin secretion, a response not observed in the cells of the proximal small intestine, introducing a potential for various subtypes of cells that are able to perform the "S cell" function.

=== Function and regulation ===
==== Regulation of secretin release ====
Secretin release is primarily regulated by the introduction of acidic chyme from the stomach into the duodenum. As the pH of the intestinal lumen decreases, S cells are stimulated to release secretin into the bloodstream. The precise molecular mechanism of pH sensing within S cells is not fully understood, although there are theories that S cells possess hydrogen ion receptors. Once released, secretin will travel through circulation to target tissues, particularly pancreatic ductal epithelium, where it stimulates bicarbonate-rich fluid release. In the duodenum, the neutralization of acidic chyme creates a favorable environment wherein pancreatic digestive enzymes are able to function without denaturing. This increase of pH in the intestinal lumen decreases the stimulus for secretin release in S cells. This negative feedback mechanism helps maintain intestinal pH homeostasis and protects the intestinal epithelium from damage from prolonged exposure to gastric acid.

==== Secretin function ====
The endocrine function of S cells is in the secretion of the peptide hormone secretin. In the intestine, secretin helps neutralize acidic chyme by stimulating pancreatic and biliary bicarbonate secretion and suppressing the secretion of gastric acid. Pancreatic cells are able to respond to secretin levels via the membrane-bound secretin receptor, which is a G-protein coupled receptor (GPCR). Once bound to its receptor, secretin stimulates adenylate cyclase, which converts ATP to cAMP. cAMP, a secondary messenger, is then able to initiate the intracellular response that precedes the release of bicarbonate into the intestinal lumen. This GPCR mechanism allows secretin to perform three main functions in the intestine: regulation of gastric acid, regulation of pancreatic bicarbonate, and osmoregulation.

Secretin receptors are also found in various organs throughout the body, including the pancreas, bile ducts, kidney, heart, lungs, and brain. Secretin has been found to play a role in the secretion of bile salts and insulin, and is hypothesized to act as a central nervous system regulator, with secretin's potential role in the pathophysiology of some neurodegenerative diseases being active areas of research. The diverse physiological functions of secretin have caused it to be termed a neuroendocrine hormone.

=== Clinical significance ===
S cells have been found to play a role in a number of diseases. Cystic fibrosis (CF), a disease hallmarked by dysfunction of the protein CFTR, is known to cause pancreatic failure as a result of impaired pancreatic response to secretin. The dysfunctional secretin-pancreas interaction in patients with CF causes diminished pancreatic release of water and bicarbonate in response to secretin. This causes thicker, less hydrated pancreatic secretions that build up in pancreatic ducts, ultimately causing pancreatic damage. Furthermore, reduced delivery of pancreatic enzymes to the small intestine can impair digestion and nutrient absorption, resulting in many digestive symptoms associated with the disease.

Secretin is also being investigated in studies relating to obesity and type II diabetes mellitus. S cells are thought to have a role in nutrient sensing and metabolic regulation. A current theory posits that S cells may be chronically overstimulated in patients with type II diabetes, leading to the oversecretion of secretin, overabsorption of nutrients, and resultant increased resistance to insulin.

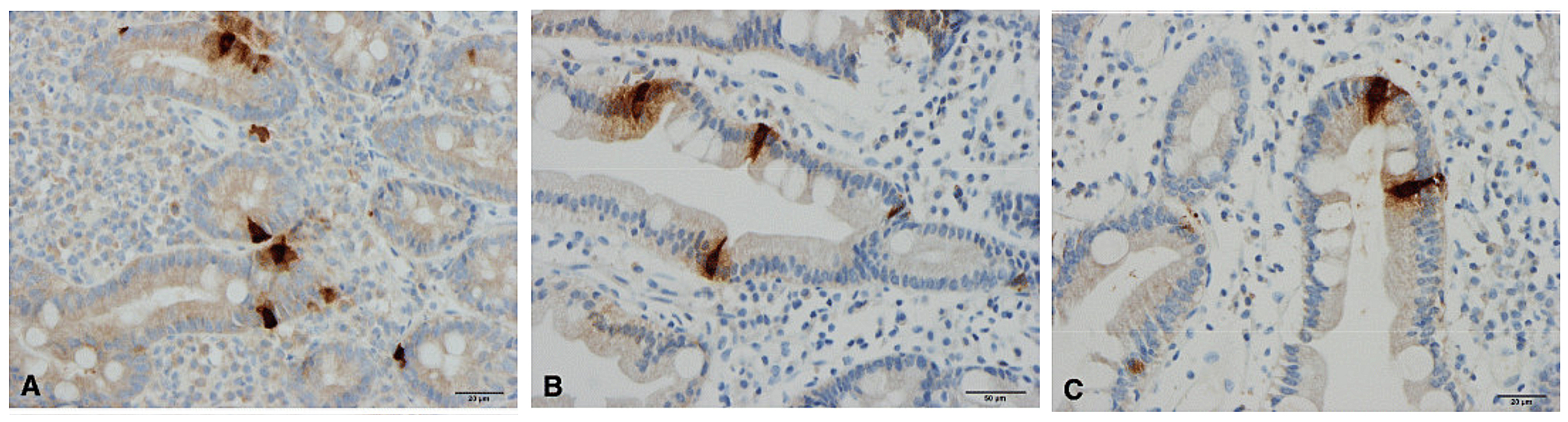
Secretin cells in the duodenum of (A) a healthy subject, (B) a patient with celiac disease (CD), and (C) a patient with irritable bowel syndrome (IBS)
