= Brain-specific angiogenesis inhibitor 2 =

Protein found in humans

ADGRB2

Identifiers
- Aliases: ADGRB2, BAI2, adhesion G protein-coupled receptor B2
- External IDs: OMIM: 602683; MGI: 2451244; GeneCards: ADGRB2

Gene location (Human)
Chr.	Chromosome 1 (human)
Band	1p35.2	Start	31,727,117 bp
Band	1p35.2	End	31,764,893 bp

Gene location (Mouse)
Chr.	Chromosome 4 (mouse)
Band	4|4 D2.2	Start	129,878,663 bp
Band	4|4 D2.2	End	129,916,426 bp
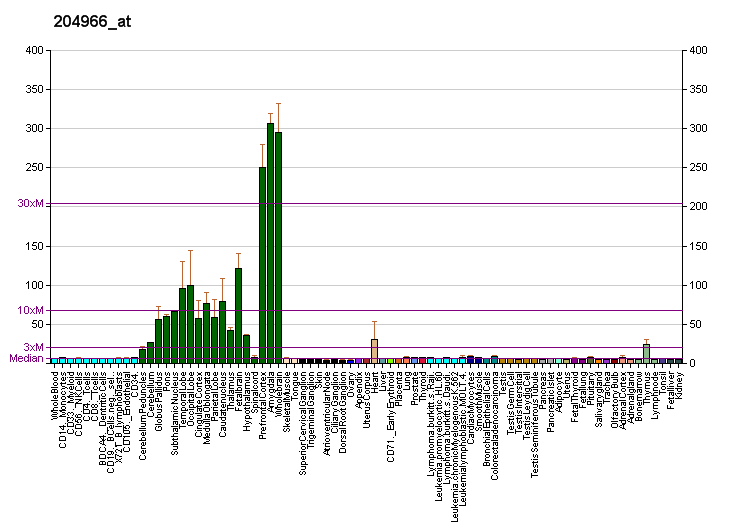
RNA expression pattern
Bgee	Human / Mouse (ortholog); Top expressed in: right frontal lobe; prefrontal cortex; anterior cingulate cortex; ganglionic eminence; dorsolateral prefrontal cortex; nucleus accumbens; caudate nucleus; Brodmann area 9; Brodmann area 10; amygdala / Top expressed in: primary visual cortex; superior frontal gyrus; dentate gyrus of hippocampal formation granule cell; subiculum; hippocampus proper; prefrontal cortex; piriform cortex; olfactory tubercle; primary motor cortex; cingulate gyrus; More reference expression data
BioGPS	More reference expression data
Gene ontology
Molecular function	transmembrane signaling receptor activity; signal transducer activity; G protein-coupled receptor activity; protein binding
Cellular component	integral component of membrane; membrane; plasma membrane; centrosome; integral component of plasma membrane
Biological process	negative regulation of angiogenesis; cell surface receptor signaling pathway; peripheral nervous system development; signal transduction; positive regulation of synapse assembly; G protein-coupled receptor signaling pathway; calcineurin-NFAT signaling cascade; adenylate cyclase-activating G protein-coupled receptor signaling pathway
Sources:Amigo / QuickGO
Orthologs
Databases	NCBI: entry; OMA: entry
Species	Human	Mouse
Entrez	576	230775
Ensembl	ENSG00000121753	ENSMUSG00000028782
UniProt	O60241	Q8CGM1
RefSeq (mRNA)	NM_001294335; NM_001294336; NM_001364857	NM_001199696; NM_001290714; NM_001290715; NM_173071; NM_001377056 NM_001377057; NM_001377058
RefSeq (protein)	NP_001281264; NP_001281265; NP_001351786	NP_001186625; NP_001277643; NP_001277644; NP_775094; NP_001363985 NP_001363986; NP_001363987
Location (UCSC)	Chr 1: 31.73 – 31.76 Mb	Chr 4: 129.88 – 129.92 Mb
PubMed search
- Wikidata
View/Edit Human	View/Edit Mouse

Brain-specific angiogenesis inhibitor 2 is a protein that in humans is encoded by the BAI2 gene. It is a member of the adhesion-GPCR family of receptors.

BAI1, a p53-target gene, encodes brain-specific angiogenesis inhibitor, a seven-span transmembrane protein and is thought to be a member of the secretin receptor family. Brain-specific angiogenesis proteins BAI2 and BAI3 are similar to BAI1 in structure, have similar tissue specificities and may also play a role in angiogenesis.
