= VIPR1 =

Protein-coding gene in humans

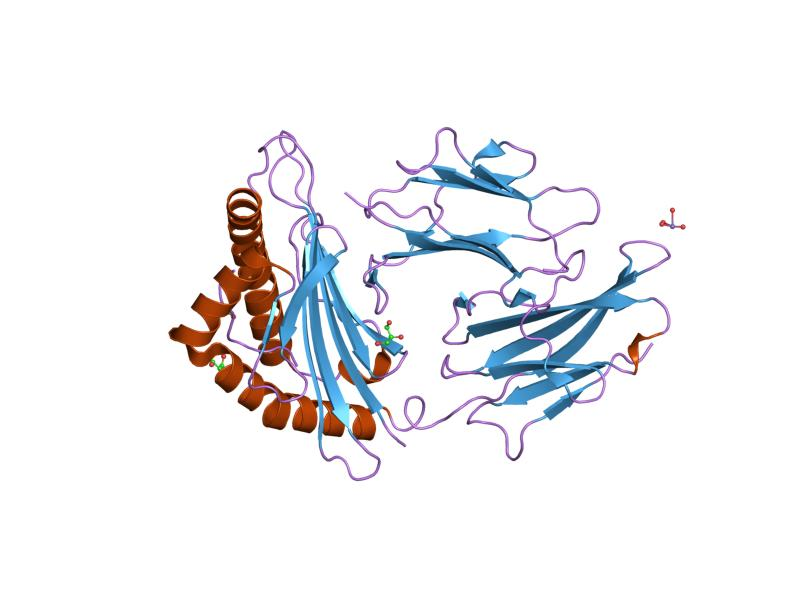

Identifiers
- Aliases: VIPR1, HVR1, II, PACAP-R-2, PACAP-R2, RDC1, V1RG, VAPC1, VIP-R-1, VIPR, VIRG, VPAC1, VPAC1R, VPCAP1R, vasoactive intestinal peptide receptor 1
- External IDs: OMIM: 192321; MGI: 109272; GeneCards: VIPR1
Available structures
PDB	Ortholog search: PDBe RCSB
PDB	List of PDB id codes 1OF2, 1OGT, 3B3I, 3B6S, 3DTX, 3HCV, 5DEF, 5DEG

Gene location (Human)
Chr.	Chromosome 3 (human)
Band	3p22.1	Start	42,489,299 bp
Band	3p22.1	End	42,537,573 bp

Gene location (Mouse)
Chr.	Chromosome 9 (mouse)
Band	9 F4|9 72.5 cM	Start	121,471,782 bp
Band	9 F4|9 72.5 cM	End	121,502,020 bp
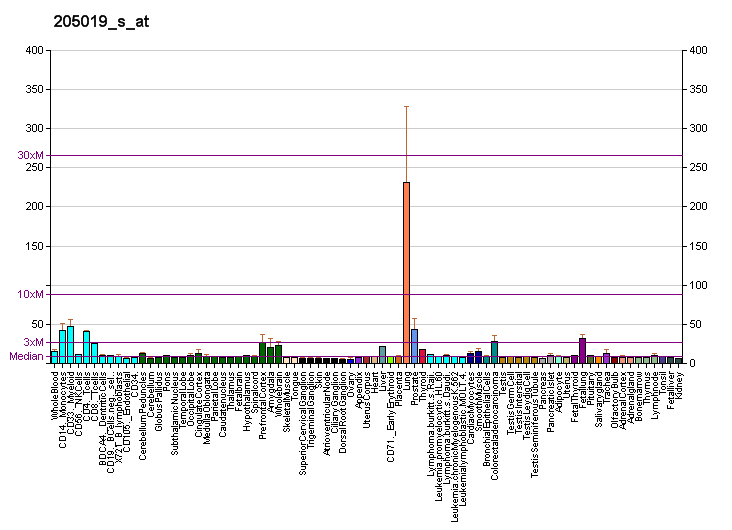
RNA expression pattern
Bgee	Human / Mouse (ortholog); Top expressed in: right lung; upper lobe of left lung; mucosa of transverse colon; rectum; mucosa of ileum; skin of leg; skin of abdomen; duodenum; right hemisphere of cerebellum; minor salivary glands / Top expressed in: Paneth cell; large intestine; colon; left colon; duodenum; jejunum; ileum; granulocyte; superior frontal gyrus; islet of Langerhans; More reference expression data
BioGPS	More reference expression data
Gene ontology
Molecular function	transmembrane signaling receptor activity; signal transducer activity; G protein-coupled receptor activity; protein binding; vasoactive intestinal polypeptide receptor activity; peptide hormone binding; G protein-coupled peptide receptor activity
Cellular component	plasma membrane; membrane; integral component of membrane; receptor complex; integral component of plasma membrane
Biological process	cell surface receptor signaling pathway; positive regulation of cell population proliferation; G protein-coupled receptor signaling pathway; signal transduction; G protein-coupled receptor signaling pathway, coupled to cyclic nucleotide second messenger
Sources:Amigo / QuickGO
Orthologs
Databases	NCBI: entry; OMA: entry
Species	Human	Mouse
Entrez	7433	22354
Ensembl	ENSG00000114812	ENSMUSG00000032528
UniProt	P32241	P97751
RefSeq (mRNA)	NM_001251882; NM_001251883; NM_001251884; NM_001251885; NM_004624	NM_011703
RefSeq (protein)	NP_001238811; NP_001238812; NP_001238813; NP_001238814; NP_004615	NP_035833
Location (UCSC)	Chr 3: 42.49 – 42.54 Mb	Chr 9: 121.47 – 121.5 Mb
PubMed search
- Wikidata
View/Edit Human	View/Edit Mouse

Vasoactive intestinal polypeptide receptor 1 also known as VPAC_{1}, is a protein, that in humans is encoded by the VIPR1 gene. VPAC_{1} is expressed in the brain (cerebral cortex, hippocampus, amygdala), lung, prostate, peripheral blood leukocytes, liver, small intestine, heart, spleen, placenta, kidney, thymus and testis.

== Function ==
VPAC_{1} is a receptor for vasoactive intestinal peptide (VIP), a small neuropeptide. Vasoactive intestinal peptide is involved in smooth muscle relaxation, exocrine and endocrine secretion, and water and ion flux in lung and intestinal epithelia. Its actions are effected through integral membrane receptors associated with a guanine nucleotide binding protein which activates adenylate cyclase.

VIP acts in an autocrine fashion via VPAC_{1}1 to inhibit megakaryocyte proliferation and induce proplatelet formation.

== Clinical significance ==
Patients with idiopathic achalasia show a significant difference in the distribution of SNPs affecting VIPR1.

VIP and PACAP levels were decreased in anterior vaginal wall of stress urinary incontinence and pelvic organ prolapse patients, they may participate in the pathophysiology of these diseases.

== See also ==
- Vasoactive intestinal peptide receptor
