= Vasoactive intestinal peptide receptor =

InterPro Family

vasoactive intestinal peptide receptor 1

Identifiers
- Symbol: VIPR1
- Alt. symbols: RDC1, HVR1, VAPC1
- NCBI gene: 7433
- HGNC: 12694
- OMIM: 192321
- RefSeq: NM_004624
- UniProt: P32241

Other data
- Locus: Chr. 3 p22
Search for
- Structures: Swiss-model
- Domains: InterPro

vasoactive intestinal peptide receptor 2

Identifiers
- Symbol: VIPR2
- Alt. symbols: VPAC2
- NCBI gene: 7434
- HGNC: 12695
- OMIM: 601970
- RefSeq: NM_003382
- UniProt: P41587

Other data
- Locus: Chr. 7 q36.3
Search for
- Structures: Swiss-model
- Domains: InterPro

adenylate cyclase activating polypeptide 1 (pituitary) receptor type I

Identifiers
- Symbol: ADCYAP1R1
- Alt. symbols: PACAPR
- NCBI gene: 117
- HGNC: 242
- OMIM: 102981
- RefSeq: NM_001118
- UniProt: P41586

Other data
- Locus: Chr. 7 p14
Search for
- Structures: Swiss-model
- Domains: InterPro

There are two known receptors for the vasoactive intestinal peptide (VIP) termed VPAC_{1} and VPAC_{2}. These receptors bind both VIP and pituitary adenylate cyclase-activating polypeptide (PACAP) to some degree. Both receptors are members of the 7 transmembrane G protein-coupled receptor family.

VPAC_{1} is distributed widely in the CNS, liver, lung, intestine and T-lymphocytes.

VPAC_{2} is found in the CNS, pancreas, skeletal muscle, heart, kidney, adipose tissue, testis, and stomach.

Vasoactive intestinal peptide (VIP) and pituitary adenylate cyclase-activating peptide (PACAP) receptors are activated by the endogenous peptides VIP, PACAP-38, PACAP-27, peptide histidine isoleucineamide (PHI), peptide histidine methionineamide (PHM) and peptide histidine valine (PHV). “PACAP type II receptors” (VPAC1 and VPAC2 receptors) display comparable affinity for PACAP and VIP, whereas PACAP-27 and PACAP-38 are >100 fold more potent than VIP as agonists of most isoforms of the PAC1 receptor.
