= Vasoactivity =

Endogenous agent or pharmaceutical drug that affects blood pressure / heart rate

A vasoactive substance is an endogenous agent or pharmaceutical drug that has the effect of either increasing or decreasing blood pressure and/or heart rate through its vasoactivity, that is, vascular activity (effect on blood vessels). By adjusting vascular compliance and vascular resistance, typically through vasodilation and vasoconstriction, it helps the body's homeostatic mechanisms (such as the renin–angiotensin system) to keep hemodynamics under control. For example, angiotensin, bradykinin, histamine, nitric oxide, and vasoactive intestinal peptide are important endogenous vasoactive substances. Vasoactive drug therapy is typically used when a patient has the blood pressure and heart rate monitored constantly. The dosage is typically titrated (adjusted up or down) to achieve a desired effect or range of values as determined by competent clinicians.

Vasoactive drugs are typically administered using a volumetric infusion device (IV pump). This category of drugs require close observation of the patient with near immediate intervention required by the clinicians in charge of the patient's care. Important vasoactive substances are angiotensin-11, endothelin-1, and alpha-adrenergic agonists.

Various vasoactive agents, such as prostanoids, phosphodiesterase inhibitors, and endothelin antagonists, are approved for the treatment of pulmonary arterial hypertension. The use of vasoactive agents for patients with pulmonary hypertension may cause harm and unnecessary expense to persons with left heart disease or hypoxemic types of lung diseases.
