= Secretin receptor =

Protein-coding gene in the species Homo sapiens

SCTR

Identifiers
- Aliases: SCTR, SR, secretin receptor
- External IDs: OMIM: 182098; MGI: 2441720; GeneCards: SCTR

Gene location (Human)
Chr.	Chromosome 2 (human)
Band	2q14.2	Start	119,439,843 bp
Band	2q14.2	End	119,525,301 bp

Gene location (Mouse)
Chr.	Chromosome 1 (mouse)
Band	1|1 E2.3	Start	119,934,624 bp
Band	1|1 E2.3	End	119,991,266 bp
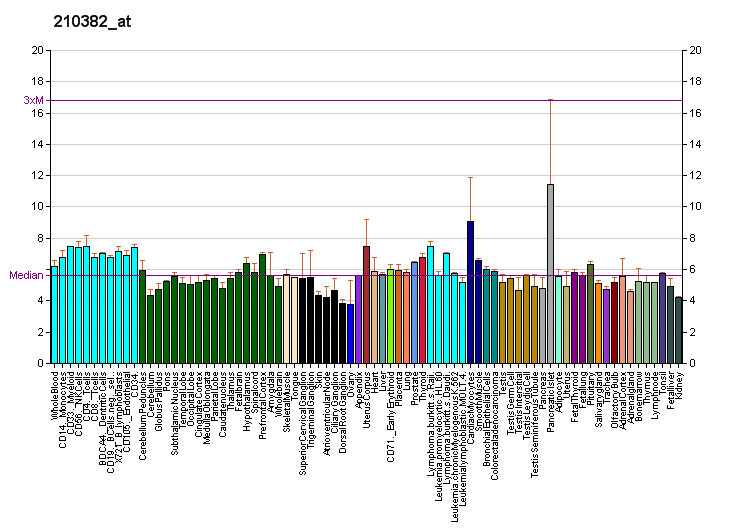
RNA expression pattern
Bgee	Human / Mouse (ortholog); Top expressed in: body of pancreas; testicle; islet of Langerhans; duodenum; right lung; upper lobe of left lung; body of stomach; human kidney; gallbladder; right uterine tube / Top expressed in: muscle of thigh; epithelium of stomach; morula; knee joint; lumbar subsegment of spinal cord; soleus muscle; tibialis anterior muscle; vastus lateralis muscle; temporal muscle; upper arm; More reference expression data
BioGPS	More reference expression data
Gene ontology
Molecular function	G protein-coupled receptor activity; transmembrane signaling receptor activity; signal transducer activity; secretin receptor activity; peptide hormone binding; G protein-coupled peptide receptor activity
Cellular component	integral component of membrane; cytoplasmic microtubule; plasma membrane; membrane
Biological process	cell surface receptor signaling pathway; signal transduction; G protein-coupled receptor signaling pathway; brain development; diet induced thermogenesis; cellular water homeostasis; response to nutrient levels; regulation of appetite; positive regulation of cAMP-mediated signaling; regulation of synaptic plasticity
Sources:Amigo / QuickGO
Orthologs
Databases	NCBI: entry; OMA: entry
Species	Human	Mouse
Entrez	6344	319229
Ensembl	ENSG00000080293	ENSMUSG00000026387
UniProt	P47872	Q5FWI2
RefSeq (mRNA)	NM_002980	NM_001012322; NM_001311077
RefSeq (protein)	NP_002971	NP_001012322; NP_001298006
Location (UCSC)	Chr 2: 119.44 – 119.53 Mb	Chr 1: 119.93 – 119.99 Mb
PubMed search
- Wikidata
View/Edit Human	View/Edit Mouse

The secretin receptor is a protein that in humans is encoded by the SCTR gene. This protein is a G protein-coupled receptor which binds secretin and is the leading member (i.e., first cloned) of the secretin receptor family, also called class B GPCR subfamily. SCTR belongs to the glucagon-VIP-secretin receptor family; its locus is 2q14.2.

== Interactions ==
The secretin receptor has been shown to interact with pituitary adenylate cyclase activating peptide.

== Clinical significance ==
=== Breast cancer ===
SCTR neither uniformly upregulated or downregulated in tumors, hence, it has the potential to promote or suppress tumor proliferation. In a study investigating methylation of the SCTR genes in breast cancer tissue, hypermethylation and downregulation were observed; pathway analysis in MCF-10A cells determined these most likely effect the G2/M stage checkpoint. However, SCTR was overexpressed in MCF-7 cells, leading to increased proliferation and migration. The study concluded that SCTR downregulates proliferation in normal breast cells and upregulates proliferation in breast cancer cells that have their proliferation downregulated by promoter methylation.

=== Colorectal cancer ===
SCTR has been observed to be hypermethylated in colorectal cancer. Moreover, because of the high frequency of hypermethylation at CpG islands in colorectal cancer, SCTR hypermethylation is an effective diagnostic marker that has achieved high diagnostic performance; colorectal cancer and precursor legions were able to be distinguished using SCTR methylation as a diagnostic tool. Additionally, SCTR genes were found to be hypermethylated in cell-free DNA samples of colorectal cancer patients, but not in cells from healthy patients.
