= Brain-specific angiogenesis inhibitor 3 =

Protein-coding gene in the species Homo sapiens

ADGRB3

Identifiers
- Aliases: ADGRB3, BAI3, adhesion G protein-coupled receptor B3
- External IDs: OMIM: 602684; MGI: 2441837; GeneCards: ADGRB3
Available structures
| PDB | Ortholog search: PDBe RCSB |
| PDB | List of PDB id codes 4DLO |

Gene location (Human)
| Chr. | Chromosome 6 (human) |
| Band | 6q12-q13 | Start | 68,635,282 bp |
| Band | 6q12-q13 | End | 69,390,571 bp |

Gene location (Mouse)
| Chr. | Chromosome 1 (mouse) |
| Band | 1|1 A5 | Start | 25,106,557 bp |
| Band | 1|1 A5 | End | 25,868,788 bp |
RNA expression pattern
| Bgee | Human / Mouse (ortholog); Top expressed in: middle temporal gyrus; endothelial cell; Brodmann area 23; ventricular zone; orbitofrontal cortex; superior frontal gyrus; Brodmann area 46; postcentral gyrus; entorhinal cortex; Region I of hippocampus proper / Top expressed in: lateral septal nucleus; nucleus accumbens; anterior amygdaloid area; olfactory tubercle; ventromedial nucleus; lobe of cerebellum; cerebellar vermis; medial geniculate nucleus; subiculum; Region I of hippocampus proper; More reference expression data |
| BioGPS | n/a |
Gene ontology
| Molecular function | G protein-coupled receptor activity; protein binding; transmembrane signaling receptor activity; signal transducer activity; GTPase activator activity |
| Cellular component | integral component of membrane; plasma membrane; membrane; postsynapse; synaptic cleft; intracellular anatomical structure; integral component of plasma membrane |
| Biological process | negative regulation of angiogenesis; G protein-coupled receptor signaling pathway; positive regulation of GTPase activity; cell surface receptor signaling pathway; myoblast fusion; signal transduction; positive regulation of synapse assembly; regulation of dendrite morphogenesis; motor learning; maintenance of synapse structure; neuron remodeling; adenylate cyclase-activating G protein-coupled receptor signaling pathway |
Sources:Amigo / QuickGO
Orthologs
| Databases | NCBI: entry; OMA: entry |
| Species | Human | Mouse |
| Entrez | 577 | 210933 |
| Ensembl | ENSG00000135298 | ENSMUSG00000033569 |
| UniProt | O60242 | Q80ZF8 |
| RefSeq (mRNA) | NM_001704 | NM_175642 |
| RefSeq (protein) | NP_001695 | NP_783573 |
| Location (UCSC) | Chr 6: 68.64 – 69.39 Mb | Chr 1: 25.11 – 25.87 Mb |
| PubMed search |
- Wikidata
| View/Edit Human | View/Edit Mouse |

Brain-specific angiogenesis inhibitor 3 is a protein that in humans is encoded by the BAI3 gene.

BAI1, a p53-target gene, encodes brain-specific angiogenesis inhibitor, a seven-span transmembrane protein and is thought to be a member of the secretin receptor family. Brain-specific angiogenesis proteins BAI2 and BAI3 are similar to BAI1 in structure, have similar tissue specificities and may also play a role in angiogenesis. The BAI3 receptor has also been found to regulate dendrite morphogenesis, arborization growth and branching in cultured neurons.

The adhesion GPCR BaI3 is an orphan receptor that has a long N-terminus consisting of one cub domain, five BaI Thrombospondin type 1 repeats, and one hormone binding domain. BaI3 is expressed in neural tissues of the central nervous system. BaI3 has been shown to have a high affinity for C1q proteins. C1q added to hippocampal neurons expressing BaI3 resulted in a decrease in the number of synapses.
