= MRGPRX2 =

Protein-coding gene in the species Homo sapiens

Identifiers
- Aliases: MRGPRX2, MGRG3, MRGX2, MAS related GPR family member X2
- External IDs: OMIM: 607228; MGI: 3588270; GeneCards: MRGPRX2

Gene location (Human)
Chr.	Chromosome 11 (human)
Band	11p15.1	Start	19,054,455 bp
Band	11p15.1	End	19,060,717 bp

Gene location (Mouse)
Chr.	Chromosome 7 (mouse)
Band	7|7 B4	Start	48,128,367 bp
Band	7|7 B4	End	48,149,069 bp
RNA expression pattern
Bgee	Human / Mouse (ortholog); Top expressed in: testicle; skin of abdomen; skin of leg; subcutaneous adipose tissue; rectum; urinary bladder; fundus; vagina; gastric mucosa; smooth muscle tissue / Top expressed in: muscle of thigh; zone of skin; quadriceps femoris muscle; lip; esophagus; More reference expression data
BioGPS	n/a
Gene ontology
Molecular function	neuropeptide binding; signal transducer activity; mast cell secretagogue receptor activity; G protein-coupled receptor activity
Cellular component	plasma membrane; membrane; integral component of membrane; mast cell granule; integral component of plasma membrane
Biological process	sleep; positive regulation of cytokinesis; mast cell activation; G protein-coupled receptor signaling pathway; signal transduction; sensory perception of pain; mast cell degranulation
Sources:Amigo / QuickGO
Orthologs
Databases	NCBI: entry; OMA: entry
Species	Human	Mouse
Entrez	117194	243978
Ensembl	ENSG00000183695	ENSMUSG00000074109
UniProt	Q96LB1	Q3UG50
RefSeq (mRNA)	NM_001303615; NM_054030	NM_001034868
RefSeq (protein)	NP_001290544; NP_473371	NP_001030040
Location (UCSC)	Chr 11: 19.05 – 19.06 Mb	Chr 7: 48.13 – 48.15 Mb
PubMed search
- Wikidata
View/Edit Human	View/Edit Mouse

Mas-related G-protein coupled receptor member X2 is a protein that in humans is encoded by the MRGPRX2 gene. It is most abundant on cutaneous mast cells, sensory neurons, and keratinocytes.

Activation of MRGPRX2 on mast cells leads to IgE-independent type 1 hypersensitivity-like symptoms, also known as pseudoallergic reactions, although more rapid and brief. Medications identified to cause MRGPRX2 activation including neuromuscular blocking agents (NMBA) (except for succinylcholine), antibiotics like DNA gyrase inhibitor fluoroquinolones or cell wall synthesis inhibitor vancomycin (which caused red man syndrome), icatibant, leuprolide, and morphine.

== See also ==
- MAS1 oncogene
- Pseudoallergy
