= Vasoactive intestinal peptide =

Hormone that affects blood pressure / heart rate

VIP

Identifiers
- Aliases: VIP, vasoactive intestinal peptide, PHM27
- External IDs: OMIM: 192320; MGI: 98933; GeneCards: VIP
Available structures
PDB	Ortholog search: PDBe RCSB
PDB	List of PDB id codes 2RRI, 2RRH

Gene location (Human)
Chr.	Chromosome 6 (human)
Band	6q25.2	Start	152,750,797 bp
Band	6q25.2	End	152,759,765 bp

Gene location (Mouse)
Chr.	Chromosome 10 (mouse)
Band	10|10 A1	Start	5,589,218 bp
Band	10|10 A1	End	5,597,617 bp
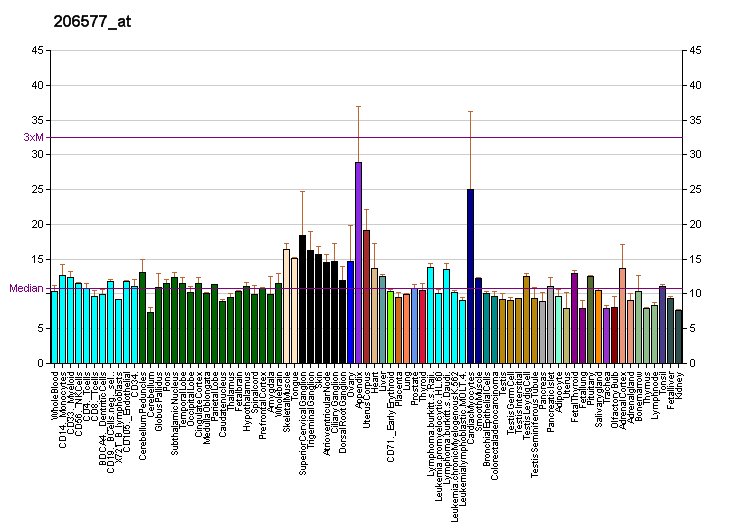
RNA expression pattern
Bgee	Human / Mouse (ortholog); Top expressed in: appendix; rectum; gonad; muscle layer of sigmoid colon; testicle; gastric mucosa; endothelial cell; transverse colon; cingulate gyrus; anterior cingulate cortex / Top expressed in: suprachiasmatic nucleus; Paneth cell; prefrontal cortex; left colon; primary visual cortex; duodenum; barrel cortex; superior frontal gyrus; pyloric antrum; ileum; More reference expression data
BioGPS	More reference expression data
Gene ontology
Molecular function	hormone activity; protein binding; neuropeptide hormone activity; peptide hormone receptor binding
Cellular component	extracellular region; intracellular anatomical structure; neuron projection; perikaryon
Biological process	G protein-coupled receptor signaling pathway; body fluid secretion; prolactin secretion; mRNA stabilization; positive regulation of cell population proliferation; innate immune response; positive regulation of protein catabolic process; regulation of protein localization; antimicrobial humoral immune response mediated by antimicrobial peptide; regulation of signaling receptor activity; adenylate cyclase-activating G protein-coupled receptor signaling pathway; positive regulation of endothelial cell proliferation; learning or memory; positive regulation of epinephrine secretion; negative regulation of apoptotic process; negative regulation of potassium ion transport; epinephrine secretion; negative regulation of smooth muscle cell proliferation; regulation of sensory perception of pain; positive regulation of penile erection; phospholipase C-activating G protein-coupled receptor signaling pathway
Sources:Amigo / QuickGO
Orthologs
Databases	NCBI: entry; OMA: entry
Species	Human	Mouse
Entrez	7432	22353
Ensembl	ENSG00000146469	ENSMUSG00000019772
UniProt	P01282	P32648
RefSeq (mRNA)	NM_003381; NM_194435	NM_011702; NM_001313969
RefSeq (protein)	NP_003372; NP_919416	NP_001300898; NP_035832; NP_001394459; NP_001394460; NP_001394461 NP_001394462; NP_001394463
Location (UCSC)	Chr 6: 152.75 – 152.76 Mb	Chr 10: 5.59 – 5.6 Mb
PubMed search
- Wikidata
View/Edit Human	View/Edit Mouse

Vasoactive intestinal peptide, also known as vasoactive intestinal polypeptide or VIP, is a peptide hormone that is vasoactive in the intestine. VIP is a peptide of 28 amino acid residues that belongs to a glucagon/secretin superfamily, the ligand of class II G protein–coupled receptors. VIP is produced in many tissues of vertebrates including the gut, pancreas, neocortex, and suprachiasmatic nuclei of the hypothalamus in the brain. VIP stimulates contractility in the heart, causes vasodilation, increases glycogenolysis, lowers arterial blood pressure and relaxes the smooth muscle of trachea, stomach and gallbladder. In humans, the vasoactive intestinal peptide is encoded by the VIP gene.

VIP has a half-life (t_{½}) in the blood of about two minutes.

== Function ==
=== In the digestive system ===
In the digestive system, VIP seems to induce smooth muscle relaxation (lower esophageal sphincter, stomach, gallbladder), stimulate secretion of water into pancreatic juice and bile, and cause inhibition of gastric acid secretion and absorption from the intestinal lumen. Its role in the intestine is to greatly stimulate secretion of water and electrolytes, as well as relaxation of enteric smooth muscle, dilating peripheral blood vessels, stimulating pancreatic bicarbonate secretion, and inhibiting gastrin-stimulated gastric acid secretion. These effects work together to increase motility. It also has the function of stimulating pepsinogen secretion by chief cells. VIP seems to be an important neuropeptide during inflammatory bowel diseases since the communication between mast cells and VIP in colitis, as in Crohn's disease, is upregulated.

=== In the heart ===
It is also found in the heart and has significant effects on the cardiovascular system. It causes coronary vasodilation as well as having a positive inotropic and chronotropic effect. Research is being performed to see if it may have a beneficial role in the treatment of heart failure.

=== In the brain ===
VIP is also found in the brain and some autonomic nerves:

One region includes a specific area of the suprachiasmatic nuclei (SCN), the location of the 'master circadian pacemaker'. See SCN and circadian rhythm below. VIP in the pituitary helps to regulate prolactin secretion; it stimulates prolactin release in the domestic turkey. Additionally, the growth-hormone-releasing hormone (GH-RH) is a member of the VIP family and stimulates growth hormone secretion in the anterior pituitary gland.

VIP is also expressed in a subtype of inhibitory interneuron in various regions of the brain.

=== In other areas of the body ===
VIP provokes vaginal lubrication, doubling the total volume of lubrication produced.

== Mechanisms ==
VIP binds to both VPAC1 and VPAC2 receptors. When VIP binds to VPAC2 receptors, a G-alpha-mediated signaling cascade is triggered. In a number of systems, VIP binding activates adenyl cyclase activity leading to increases in cAMP concentration and PKA activity. The PKA then activates other intracellular signaling pathways like the phosphorylation of CREB and other transcriptional factors. The mPer1 and mPer2 promoters have CRE domains and thus provides the mechanism for VIP to regulate the molecular clock itself. Then it will activate gene expression pathways such as Per1 and Per2 in circadian rhythm.

In addition, GABA levels are connected to VIP in that they are co-released. Sparse GABAergic connections are thought to decrease synchronized firing. While GABA controls the amplitude of SCN neuronal rhythms, it is not critical for maintaining synchrony. However, if GABA release is dynamic, it may mask or amplify synchronizing effects of VIP inappropriately.

Circadian time is likely to affect the synapses rather than the organization of VIP circuits.

=== SCN and circadian rhythm ===
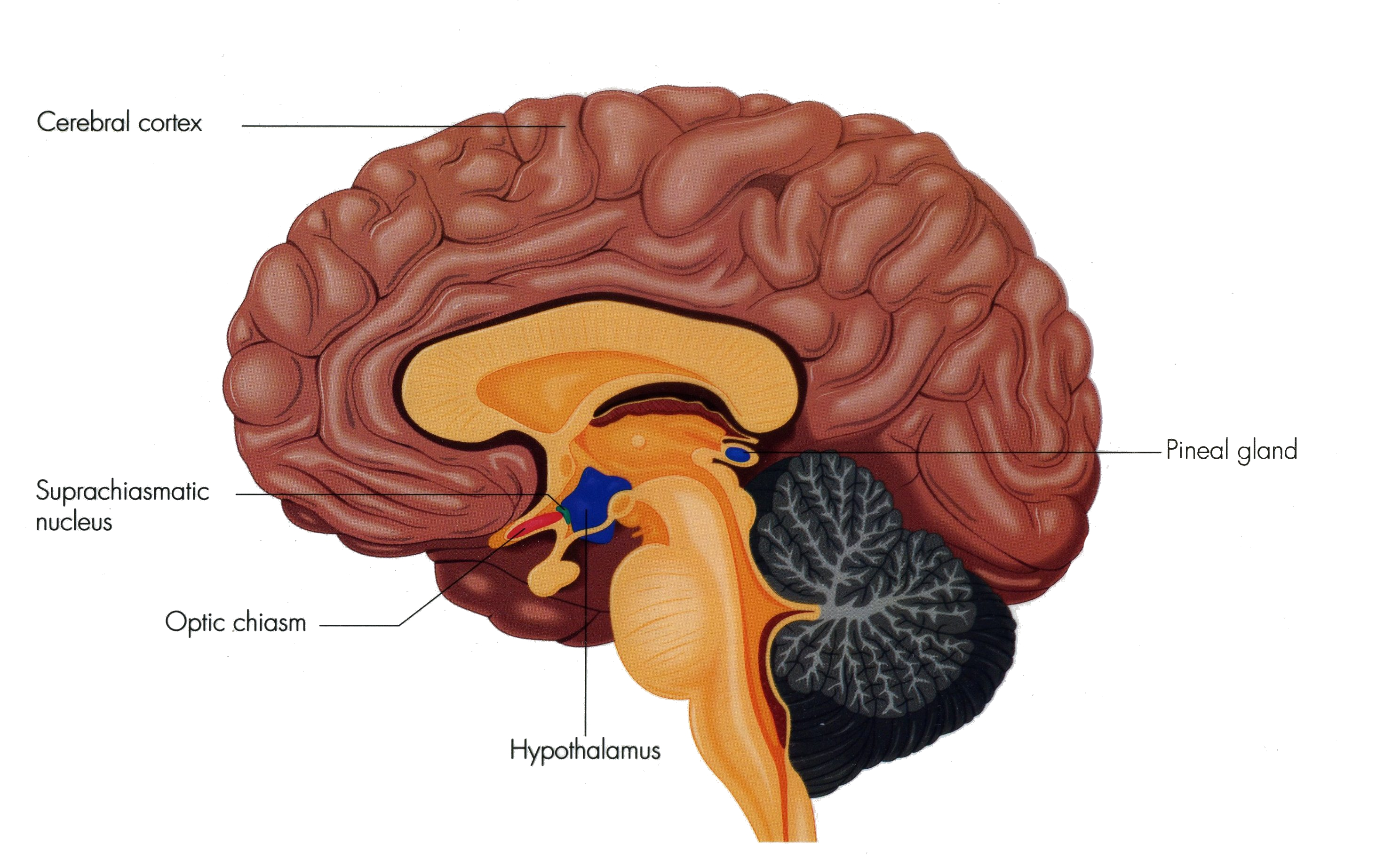
Suprachiasmatic nucleus is shown in green.

The SCN coordinates daily timekeeping in the body and VIP plays a key role in communication between individual brain cells within this region. At a cellular level, the SCN expresses different electrical activity in circadian time. Higher activity is observed during the day, while during night there is lower activity. This rhythm is thought to be important feature of SCN to synchronize with each other and control rhythmicity in other regions.

VIP acts as a major synchronizing agent among SCN neurons and plays a role in synchronizing the SCN with light cues. The high concentration of VIP and VIP receptor containing neurons are primarily found in the ventrolateral aspect of the SCN, which is also located above the optic chiasm. The neurons in this area receive retinal information from the retinohypothalamic tract and then relay the environmental information to the SCN. Further, VIP is also involved in synchronizing the timing of SCN function with the environmental light-dark cycle. Combined, these roles in the SCN make VIP a crucial component of the mammalian circadian timekeeping machinery.

After finding evidence of VIP in the SCN, researchers began contemplating its role within the SCN and how it could affect circadian rhythm. The VIP also plays a pivotal role in modulating oscillations. Previous pharmacological research has established that VIP is needed for normal light-induced synchronization of the circadian systems. Application of VIP also phase shifts the circadian rhythm of vasopressin release and neural activity. The ability of the population to remain synchronized as well as the ability of single cells to generate oscillations is composed in VIP or VIP receptor deficient mice. While not highly studied, there is evidence that levels of VIP and its receptor may vary depending on each circadian oscillation.

The leading hypothesis of VIP function points to the neurons using VIP to communicate with specific postsynaptic targets to regulate circadian rhythm. The depolarization of the VIP-expressing neurons by light appears to cause the release of VIP and co-transmitters (including GABA) that can in turn, alter the properties of the next set of neurons with the activation of VPAC2. Another hypothesis supports VIP sending a paracrine signal from a distance rather than the adjacent postsynaptic neuron.

=== Signaling pathway ===
In SCN, there is an abundant amount of VPAC2. The presence of VPAC2 in ventrolateral side suggests that VIP signals can actually signal back to regulate VIP secreting cells. SCN has neural multiple pathways to control and modulate endocrine activity.

VIP and vasopressin are both important for neurons to relay information to different targets and affect neuroendocrine function. They transmit information through such relay nuclei as the SPZ (subparaventricular zone), DMH (dorsomedial hypothalamic nucleus), MPOA (medial preoptic area) and PVN (paraventricular nucleus of hypothalamus).

== Social behavior ==
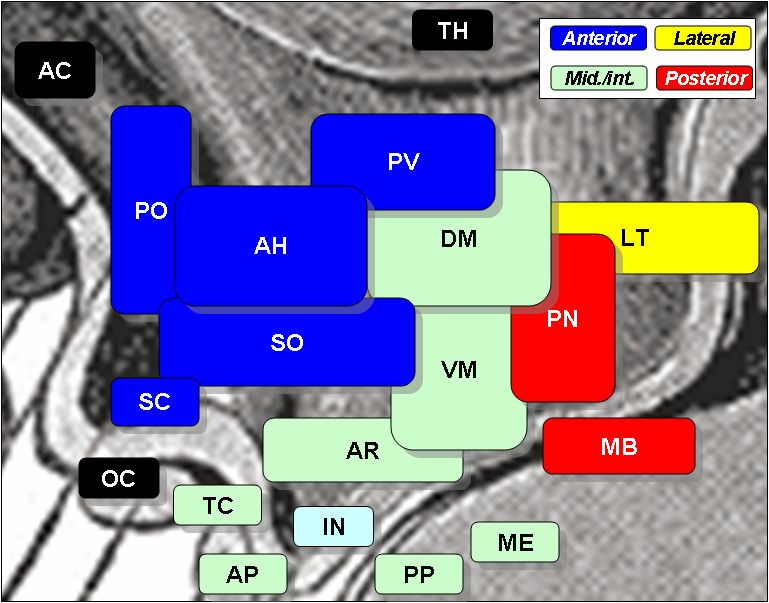
Ventromedial hypothalamus (VM), optic chiasm (OC), anterior pituitary (AP), and posterior pituitary (PP) are shown here.

VIP neurons located in the hypothalamus, specifically the dorsal anterior hypothalamus and ventromedial hypothalamus, have an effect on social behaviors in many species of vertebrates. Studies in birds suggest that VIP circuits may play an important role in regulating a wide range of social behaviors. This social circuit includes many areas of the hypothalamus along with the amygdala and the ventral tegmental area. The production and release of the neuropeptide VIP is centralized in the hypothalamic and extrahypothalamic regions of the brain and from there it is able to modulate the release of prolactin secretion. Once secreted from the pituitary gland, prolactin can increase many behaviors such as parental care and aggression. In certain species of birds with a knockout VIP gene there was an observable decrease in overall aggression over nesting territory.

== Pathology ==
VIP is overproduced in VIPoma.

In addition to VIPoma, VIP has a role in osteoarthritis (OA). While there is existing conflict in whether down-regulation or up-regulation of VIP contributes to OA, VIP has been shown to prevent cartilage damage in animals.

== See also ==
- Hypothalamic–pituitary–prolactin axis
- Vasoactive intestinal peptide receptor
- VPAC1
- VPAC2
