= Human accelerated regions =

Name of some human genes

Human accelerated regions (HARs), first described in August 2006, are a set of 49 segments of the human genome that are conserved throughout vertebrate evolution but are strikingly different in humans. Further studies have defined different sets of human accelerated regions. They are named according to their degree of difference between humans and chimpanzees (HAR1 showing the largest degree of human-chimpanzee differences). Found by scanning through genomic database of multiple species, some of these highly mutated areas may contribute to human-specific traits. Others may represent loss of functional mutations, possibly due to the action of biased gene conversion rather than adaptive evolution.

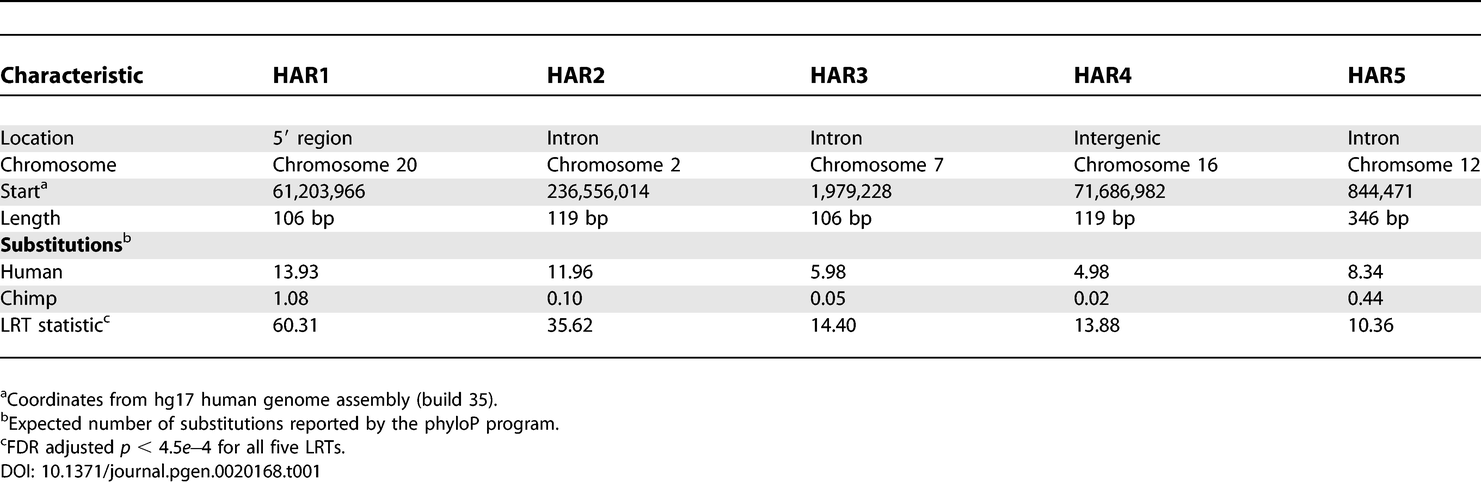
Characterisation of HAR1-HAR5 regions, from a paper on Forces shaping the fastest evolving regions in the human genome by Katherine Pollard et al.

Several of the HARs encompass genes known to produce proteins important in neurodevelopment. HAR1 is a 106-base pair stretch found on the long arm of chromosome 20 overlapping with part of the RNA genes HAR1F and HAR1R. HAR1F is active in the developing human brain. The HAR1 sequence is found (and conserved) in chickens and chimpanzees but is not present in fish or frogs that have been studied. There are 18 base pair mutations different between humans and chimpanzees, far more than expected by its history of conservation.

HAR2 includes HACNS1 a gene enhancer "that may have contributed to the evolution of the uniquely opposable human thumb, and possibly also modifications in the ankle or foot that allow humans to walk on two legs". Evidence to date shows that of the 110,000 gene enhancer sequences identified in the human genome, HACNS1 has undergone the most change during the evolution of humans following the split with the ancestors of chimpanzees. The substitutions in HAR2 may have resulted in loss of binding sites for a repressor, possibly due to biased gene conversion.

== Non-comprehensive list of HAR-associated genes ==
- HAR01: HAR1F & HAR1R
- HAR02: CENTG2 including the HACNS1 module
- HAR03: MAD1L1
- HAR04: ?
- HAR05: WNK1
- HAR06: WWOX
- HAR07: ?
- HAR08: POU6F2
- HAR09: PTPRT
- HAR10: FHIT
- HAR11: DMD
- HAR12: ?
- HAR20: PPARGC1A
- HAR21: NPAS3 - association with psychiatric disorders
- HAR23: MGC27016
- HAR24: SKAP2
- HAR28: ADGRL4 (latrophilin)
- HAR31: AUTS2
- HAR33: TBC1D22A
- HAR38: ITPR1
- HAR40: ZBTB16
- HAR43: AGBL4
- HAR44: FHIT
- HAR45: POLA
- HAR47: KLHL14 (Kelch-like protein)

=== Human accelerated regions ===
The HAR regions may be downloaded from:

NCBI: https://www.ncbi.nlm.nih.gov/geo/query/acc.cgi?acc=GSE180714

UCSC Genome Browser: https://genome.ucsc.edu/cgi-bin/hgTracks?db=hg38&lastVirtModeType=default&lastVirtModeExtraState=&virtModeType=default&virtMode=0&nonVirtPosition=&position=chrY%3A12356610%2D12382346&hgsid=2451636823_Q4Hu6KRd6b9l1ONskk5JMRWgM1oL

== See also ==
- Ultra-conserved element
- Human evolutionary genetics
- Human evolutionary developmental biology
