= Human evolutionary genetics =

Study of differences between human genomes

Human evolutionary genetics studies how one human genome differs from another human genome, the evolutionary past that gave rise to the human genome, and its current effects. Differences between genomes have anthropological, medical, historical and forensic implications and applications. Genetic data can provide important insights into human evolution.

== Origin of apes ==
The taxonomic relationships of hominoids

Hominin timeline
← / Earlier apes; ← / Gorilla split; ← / Chimpanzee split; ← / Earliest bipedal; ← / Earliest sign of Ardipithecus; ← / Earliest sign of Australopithecus; ← / Earliest stone tools; ← / Earliest sign of Homo; ← / Dispersal beyond Africa; ← / Earliest fire / cooking; ← / Earliest rock art; ← / Earliest clothes; ← / Modern humans
(million years ago)

Biologists classify humans, along with only a few other species, as great apes (species in the family Hominidae). The living Hominidae include two distinct species of chimpanzee (the bonobo, Pan paniscus, and the chimpanzee, Pan troglodytes), two species of gorilla (the western gorilla, Gorilla gorilla, and the eastern gorilla, Gorilla graueri), and three species of orangutan (the Bornean orangutan, Pongo pygmaeus, the Tapanuli orangutan, Pongo tapanuliensis, and the Sumatran orangutan, Pongo abelii). The great apes with the family Hylobatidae of gibbons form the superfamily Hominoidea of apes.

Apes, in turn, belong to the primate order (>400 species), along with the Old World monkeys, the New World monkeys, and others. Data from both mitochondrial DNA (mtDNA) and nuclear DNA (nDNA) indicate that primates belong to the group of Euarchontoglires, together with Rodentia, Lagomorpha, Dermoptera, and Scandentia. This is further supported by Alu-like short interspersed nuclear elements (SINEs) which have been found only in members of the Euarchontoglires.

== Phylogenetics ==
A phylogenetic tree is usually derived from DNA or protein sequences from populations. Often, mitochondrial DNA or Y chromosome sequences are used to study ancient human demographics. These single-locus sources of DNA do not recombine and are almost always inherited from a single parent, with only one known exception in mtDNA. Individuals from closer geographic regions generally tend to be more similar than individuals from regions farther away. Distance on a phylogenetic tree can be used approximately to indicate:

1. Genetic distance. The genetic difference between humans and chimpanzees is less than 2%, or three times larger than the variation among modern humans (estimated at 0.6%).
2. Temporal remoteness of the most recent common ancestor. The mitochondrial most recent common ancestor of modern humans is estimated to have lived roughly 160,000 years ago, the latest common ancestors of humans and chimpanzees roughly 5 to 6 million years ago.

== Speciation of humans and the African apes ==
The separation of humans from their closest relatives, the non-human African apes (chimpanzees and gorillas), has been studied extensively for more than a century. Five major questions have been addressed:

- Which apes are our closest ancestors?
- When did the separations occur?
- What was the effective population size of the common ancestor before the split?
- Are there traces of population structure (subpopulations) preceding the speciation or partial admixture succeeding it?
- What were the specific events (including fusion of chromosomes 2a and 2b) prior to and subsequent to the separation?

=== General observations ===
As discussed before, different parts of the genome show different sequence divergence between different hominoids. It has also been shown that the sequence divergence between DNA from humans and chimpanzees varies greatly. For example, the sequence divergence varies between 0% to 2.66% between non-coding, non-repetitive genomic regions of humans and chimpanzees. The percentage of nucleotides in the human genome (hg38) that had one-to-one exact matches in the chimpanzee genome (pantro6) was 84.38%. Additionally gene trees, generated by comparative analysis of DNA segments, do not always fit the species tree. Summing up:

- The sequence divergence varies significantly between humans, chimpanzees and gorillas.
- For most DNA sequences, humans and chimpanzees appear to be most closely related, but some point to a human-gorilla or chimpanzee-gorilla clade.
- The human genome has been sequenced, as well as the chimpanzee genome. Humans have 23 pairs of chromosomes, while chimpanzees, gorillas and orangutans have 24. Human chromosome 2 is a fusion of two chromosomes 2a and 2b that remained separate in the other primates.

=== Divergence times ===
The divergence time of humans from other apes is of great interest. One of the first molecular studies, published in 1967 measured immunological distances (IDs) between different primates. Basically the study measured the strength of immunological response that an antigen from one species (human albumin) induces in the immune system of another species (human, chimpanzee, gorilla and Old World monkeys). Closely related species should have similar antigens and therefore weaker immunological response to each other's antigens. The immunological response of a species to its own antigens (e.g. human to human) was set to be 1.

The ID between humans and gorillas was determined to be 1.09, that between humans and chimpanzees was determined as 1.14. However the distance to six different Old World monkeys was on average 2.46, indicating that the African apes are more closely related to humans than to monkeys. The authors consider the divergence time between Old World monkeys and hominoids to be 30 million years ago (MYA), based on fossil data, and the immunological distance was considered to grow at a constant rate. They concluded that divergence time of humans and the African apes to be roughly ~5 MYA. That was a surprising result. Most scientists at that time thought that humans and great apes diverged much earlier (>15 MYA).

The gorilla was, in ID terms, closer to human than to chimpanzees; however, the difference was so slight that the trichotomy could not be resolved with certainty. Later studies based on molecular genetics were able to resolve the trichotomy: chimpanzees are phylogenetically closer to humans than to gorillas. However, some divergence times estimated later (using much more sophisticated methods in molecular genetics) do not substantially differ from the very first estimate in 1967, but a recent paper puts it at 11–14 MYA.

=== Divergence times and ancestral effective population size ===
The sequences of the DNA segments diverge earlier than the species. A large effective population size in the ancestral population (left) preserves different variants of the DNA segments (=alleles) for a longer period of time. Therefore, on average, the gene divergence times (t_{A} for DNA segment A; t_{B} for DNA segment B) will deviate more from the time the species diverge (t_{S}) compared to a small ancestral effective population size (right).

Current methods to determine divergence times use DNA sequence alignments and molecular clocks. Usually the molecular clock is calibrated assuming that the orangutan split from the African apes (including humans) 12-16 MYA. Some studies also include some old world monkeys and set the divergence time of them from hominoids to 25-30 MYA. Both calibration points are based on very little fossil data and have been criticized.

If these dates are revised, the divergence times estimated from molecular data will change as well. However, the relative divergence times are unlikely to change. Even if we cannot tell absolute divergence times exactly, we can be fairly sure that the divergence time between chimpanzees and humans is about sixfold shorter than between chimpanzees (or humans) and monkeys.

One study (Takahata et al., 1995) used 15 DNA sequences from different regions of the genome from human and chimpanzee and 7 DNA sequences from human, chimpanzee and gorilla. They determined that chimpanzees are more closely related to humans than gorillas. Using various statistical methods, they estimated the divergence time human-chimp to be 4.7 MYA and the divergence time between gorillas and humans (and chimps) to be 7.2 MYA.

Additionally they estimated the effective population size of the common ancestor of humans and chimpanzees to be ~100,000. This was somewhat surprising since the present day effective population size of humans is estimated to be only ~10,000. If true that means that the human lineage would have experienced an immense decrease of its effective population size (and thus genetic diversity) in its evolution. (see Toba catastrophe theory)

A and B are two different loci. In the upper figure they fit to the species tree. The DNA that is present in today's gorillas diverged earlier from the DNA that is present in today's humans and chimps. Thus both loci should be more similar between human and chimp than between gorilla and chimp or gorilla and human. In the lower graph, locus A has a more recent common ancestor in human and gorilla compared to the chimp sequence. Whereas chimp and gorilla have a more recent common ancestor for locus B. Here the gene trees are incongruent to the species tree.

Another study (Chen & Li, 2001) sequenced 53 non-repetitive, intergenic DNA segments from human, chimpanzee, gorilla and orangutan. When the DNA sequences were concatenated to a single long sequence, the generated neighbor-joining tree supported the Homo-Pan clade with 100% bootstrap (that is that humans and chimpanzees are the closest related species of the four). When three species are fairly closely related to each other (like human, chimpanzee and gorilla), the trees obtained from DNA sequence data may not be congruent with the tree that represents the speciation (species tree).

The shorter the internodal time span (T_{IN}), the more common are incongruent gene trees. The effective population size (N_{e}) of the internodal population determines how long genetic lineages are preserved in the population. A higher effective population size causes more incongruent gene trees. Therefore, if the internodal time span is known, the ancestral effective population size of the common ancestor of humans and chimpanzees can be calculated.

When each segment was analyzed individually, 31 supported the Homo-Pan clade, 10 supported the Homo-Gorilla clade, and 12 supported the Pan-Gorilla clade. Using the molecular clock the authors estimated that gorillas split up first 6.2-8.4 MYA and chimpanzees and humans split up 1.6-2.2 million years later (internodal time span) 4.6-6.2 MYA. The internodal time span is useful to estimate the ancestral effective population size of the common ancestor of humans and chimpanzees.

A parsimonious analysis revealed that 24 loci supported the Homo-Pan clade, 7 supported the Homo-Gorilla clade, 2 supported the Pan-Gorilla clade and 20 gave no resolution. Additionally they took 35 protein coding loci from databases. Of these 12 supported the Homo-Pan clade, 3 the Homo-Gorilla clade, 4 the Pan-Gorilla clade and 16 gave no resolution. Therefore, only ~70% of the 52 loci that gave a resolution (33 intergenic, 19 protein coding) support the 'correct' species tree. From the fraction of loci which did not support the species tree and the internodal time span they estimated previously, the effective population of the common ancestor of humans and chimpanzees was estimated to be ~52 000 to 96 000. This value is not as high as that from the first study (Takahata), but still much higher than present day effective population size of humans.

A third study (Yang, 2002) used the same dataset that Chen and Li used but estimated the ancestral effective population of 'only' ~12,000 to 21,000, using a different statistical method.

== Genetic differences between humans and other great apes ==
Humans and chimpanzees are 99.1% identical at the coding level, with 99.4% similarity at the nonsynonymous level and 98.4% at the synonymous level. The alignable sequences within genomes of humans and chimpanzees differ by about 35 million single-nucleotide substitutions. Additionally about 3% of the complete genomes differ by deletions, insertions and duplications.

Since mutation rate is relatively constant, roughly one half of these changes occurred in the human lineage. Only a very tiny fraction of those fixed differences gave rise to the different phenotypes of humans and chimpanzees and finding those is a great challenge. The vast majority of the differences are neutral and do not affect the phenotype.

Molecular evolution may act in different ways, through protein evolution, gene loss, differential gene regulation and RNA evolution. All are thought to have played some part in human evolution.

=== Gene loss ===
Many different mutations can inactivate a gene, but few will change its function in a specific way. Inactivation mutations will therefore be readily available for selection to act on. Gene loss could thus be a common mechanism of evolutionary adaptation (the "less-is-more" hypothesis).

80 genes were lost in the human lineage after separation from the last common ancestor with the chimpanzee. 36 of those were for olfactory receptors. Genes involved in chemoreception and immune response are overrepresented. Another study estimated that 86 genes had been lost.

==== Hair keratin gene KRTHAP1 ====
A gene for type I hair keratin was lost in the human lineage. Keratins are a major component of hairs. Humans still have nine functional type I hair keratin genes, but the loss of that particular gene may have caused the thinning of human body hair. Based on the assumption of a constant molecular clock, the study predicts the gene loss occurred relatively recently in human evolution—less than 240 000 years ago, but both the Vindija Neandertal and the high-coverage Denisovan sequence contain the same premature stop codons as modern humans and hence dating should be greater than 750 000 years ago.

==== Myosin gene MYH16 ====
Stedman et al. (2004) stated that the loss of the sarcomeric myosin gene MYH16 in the human lineage led to smaller masticatory muscles. They estimated that the mutation that led to the inactivation (a two base pair deletion) occurred 2.4 million years ago, predating the appearance of Homo ergaster/erectus in Africa. The period that followed was marked by a strong increase in cranial capacity, promoting speculation that the loss of the gene may have removed an evolutionary constraint on brain size in the genus Homo.

Another estimate for the loss of the MYH16 gene is 5.3 million years ago, long before Homo appeared.

==== Other ====
- CASPASE12, a cysteinyl aspartate proteinase. The loss of this gene is speculated to have reduced the lethality of bacterial infection in humans.

=== Gene addition ===
Segmental duplications (SDs or LCRs) have had roles in creating new primate genes and shaping human genetic variation.

=== Human-specific DNA insertions ===
When the human genome was compared to the genomes of five comparison catarhine primate species, including the chimpanzee, gorilla, orangutan, gibbon, and macaque, it was found that there are approximately 20,000 human-specific insertions believed to be regulatory. While most insertions appear to be fitness neutral, a small amount have been identified in positively selected genes showing associations to neural phenotypes and some relating to dental and sensory perception-related phenotypes. These findings hint at the seemingly important role of human-specific insertions in the recent evolution of humans.

=== Selection pressures ===
Human accelerated regions are areas of the genome that differ between humans and chimpanzees to a greater extent than can be explained by genetic drift over the time since the two species shared a common ancestor. These regions show signs of being subject to natural selection, leading to the evolution of distinctly human traits. Two examples are HAR1F, which is believed to be related to brain development and HAR2 (a.k.a. HACNS1) that may have played a role in the development of the opposable thumb.

It has also been hypothesized that much of the difference between humans and chimpanzees is attributable to the regulation of gene expression rather than differences in the genes themselves. Analyses of conserved non-coding sequences, which often contain functional and thus positively selected regulatory regions, address this possibility.

=== Sequence divergence between humans and apes ===
When the draft sequence of the common chimpanzee (Pan troglodytes) genome was published in the summer 2005, 2400 million bases (of ~3160 million bases) were sequenced and assembled well enough to be compared to the human genome. 1.23% of this sequenced differed by single-base substitutions. Of this, 1.06% or less was thought to represent fixed differences between the species, with the rest being variant sites in humans or chimpanzees. Another type of difference, called indels (insertions/deletions) accounted for many fewer differences (15% as many), but contributed ~1.5% of unique sequence to each genome, since each insertion or deletion can involve anywhere from one base to millions of bases.

A companion paper examined segmental duplications in the two genomes, whose insertion and deletion into the genome account for much of the indel sequence. They found that a total of 2.7% of euchromatic sequence had been differentially duplicated in one or the other lineage.

Percentage sequence divergence between humans and other hominids
Locus	Human-Chimp	Human-Gorilla	Human-Orangutan
Alu elements	2	-	-
Non-coding (Chr. Y)	1.68 ± 0.19	2.33 ± 0.2	5.63 ± 0.35
Pseudogenes (autosomal)	1.64 ± 0.10	1.87 ± 0.11	-
Pseudogenes (Chr. X)	1.47 ± 0.17	-	-
Noncoding (autosomal)	1.24 ± 0.07	1.62 ± 0.08	3.08 ± 0.11
Genes (K_{s})	1.11	1.48	2.98
Introns	0.93 ± 0.08	1.23 ± 0.09	-
Xq13.3	0.92 ± 0.10	1.42 ± 0.12	3.00 ± 0.18
Subtotal for X chromosome	1.16 ± 0.07	1.47 ± 0.08	-
Genes (K_{a})	0.8	0.93	1.96

The sequence divergence has generally the following pattern: Human-Chimp < Human-Gorilla << Human-Orangutan, highlighting the close kinship between humans and the African apes. Alu elements diverge quickly due to their high frequency of CpG dinucleotides which mutate roughly 10 times more often than the average nucleotide in the genome. The mutation rate is higher in the male germ line, therefore the divergence in the Y chromosome—which is inherited solely from the father—is higher than in autosomes. The X chromosome is inherited twice as often through the female germ line as through the male germ line and therefore shows slightly lower sequence divergence. The sequence divergence of the Xq13.3 region is surprisingly low between humans and chimpanzees.

Mutations altering the amino acid sequence of proteins (K_{a}) are the least common. In fact ~29% of all orthologous proteins are identical between human and chimpanzee. The typical protein differs by only two amino acids. The measures of sequence divergence shown in the table only take the substitutional differences, for example from an A (adenine) to a G (guanine), into account. DNA sequences may however also differ by insertions and deletions (indels) of bases. These are usually stripped from the alignments before the calculation of sequence divergence is performed.

== Genetic differences between modern humans and Neanderthals ==
An international group of scientists completed a draft sequence of the Neanderthal genome in May 2010. The results indicate some breeding between modern humans (Homo sapiens) and Neanderthals (Homo neanderthalensis), as the genomes of non-African humans have 1–4% more in common with Neanderthals than do the genomes of subsaharan Africans. Neanderthals and most modern humans share a lactose-intolerant variant of the lactase gene that encodes an enzyme that is unable to break down lactose in milk after weaning. Modern humans and Neanderthals also share the FOXP2 gene variant associated with brain development and with speech in modern humans, indicating that Neanderthals may have been able to speak. Chimps have two amino acid differences in FOXP2 compared with human and Neanderthal FOXP2.

== Genetic differences among modern humans ==
Homo sapiens is thought to have emerged about 300,000 years ago. It dispersed throughout Africa, and after 70,000 years ago throughout Eurasia and Oceania. A 2009 study identified 14 "ancestral population clusters", the most remote being the San people of Southern Africa.

With their rapid expansion throughout different climate zones, and especially with the availability of new food sources with the domestication of cattle and the development of agriculture, human populations have been exposed to significant selective pressures since their dispersal. For example, the ancestors of East Asians are thought to have undergone processes of selection for a number of alleles, including variants of the EDAR, ADH1B, ABCC1, and ALDH2 genes.

The East Asian types of ADH1B in particular are associated with rice domestication and would thus have arisen after the development of rice cultivation roughly 10,000 years ago. Several phenotypical traits of characteristic of East Asians are due to a single mutation of the EDAR gene, dated to c. 35,000 years ago.

As of 2017, the Single Nucleotide Polymorphism Database (dbSNP), which lists SNP and other variants, listed a total of 324 million variants found in sequenced human genomes. Nucleotide diversity, the average proportion of nucleotides that differ between two individuals, is estimated at between 0.1% and 0.4% for contemporary humans (compared to 2% between humans and chimpanzees). This corresponds to genome differences at a few million sites; the 1000 Genomes Project similarly found that "a typical [individual] genome differs from the reference human genome at 4.1 million to 5.0 million sites … affecting 20 million bases of sequence."

In February 2019, scientists discovered evidence, based on genetics studies using artificial intelligence (AI), that suggest the existence of an unknown human ancestor species, not Neanderthal, Denisovan or human hybrid (like Denny (hybrid hominin)), in the genome of modern humans.

== Research studies ==
In March 2019, Chinese scientists reported inserting the human brain-related MCPH1 gene into laboratory rhesus monkeys, resulting in the transgenic monkeys performing better and answering faster on "short-term memory tests involving matching colors and shapes", compared to control non-transgenic monkeys, according to the researchers.

In May 2023, scientists reported, based on genetic studies, a more complicated pathway of human evolution than previously understood. According to the studies, humans evolved from different places and times in Africa, instead of from a single location and period of time.

On 31 August 2023, researchers reported, based on genetic studies, that a human ancestor population bottleneck occurred "around 930,000 and 813,000 years ago ... lasted for about 117,000 years and brought human ancestors close to extinction."

== See also ==
- Chimpanzee genome project
- FOXP2 and human evolution
- Genetics and archaeogenetics of South Asia
- Genetic history of Europe
- Genetic history of indigenous peoples of the Americas
- Genetic history of Italy
- Genetic history of the British Isles
- Genetic history of the Middle East
- Homininae
- List of haplogroups of historical and famous figures
- The Journey of Man: A Genetic Odyssey
- Y-DNA haplogroups by ethnic groups
- Race and genetics
- Recent human evolution
