= C1orf52 =

Human protein

Identifiers
- Aliases: C1orf52, gm117, chromosome 1 open reading frame 52
- External IDs: MGI: 1913671; GeneCards: C1orf52

Gene location (Human)
Chr.	Chromosome 1 (human)
Band	1p22.3	Start	85,249,953 bp
Band	1p22.3	End	85,259,672 bp

Gene location (Mouse)
Chr.	Chromosome 3 (mouse)
Band	3|3 H2	Start	145,643,769 bp
Band	3|3 H2	End	145,650,584 bp
RNA expression pattern
Bgee	Human / Mouse (ortholog); Top expressed in: skin of arm; pancreatic epithelial cell; Brodmann area 46; amniotic fluid; Brodmann area 23; thymus; endothelial cell; myocardium of left ventricle; germinal epithelium; tibia / Top expressed in: motor neuron; medullary collecting duct; facial motor nucleus; Paneth cell; condyle; fossa; medial ganglionic eminence; sternocleidomastoid muscle; renal corpuscle; triceps brachii muscle; More reference expression data
BioGPS	n/a
Orthologs
Databases	NCBI: entry; OMA: entry
Species	Human	Mouse
Entrez	148423	66421
Ensembl	ENSG00000162642	ENSMUSG00000036873
UniProt	Q8N6N3	Q9CWU4
RefSeq (mRNA)	NM_198077	NM_025555; NM_001356284
RefSeq (protein)	NP_932343	NP_079831; NP_001343213
Location (UCSC)	Chr 1: 85.25 – 85.26 Mb	Chr 3: 145.64 – 145.65 Mb
PubMed search
- Wikidata
View/Edit Human	View/Edit Mouse

Chromosome 1 open reading frame 52 is a protein in humans encoded by the C1orf52 gene. C1orf52 is localized in the nucleus and ubiquitously expressed in human tissues.

== Gene ==
C1orf52 is located on the minus strand at 1p22.3. The gene is 9,720 base pairs and has 3 exons.

=== Gene neighborhood ===
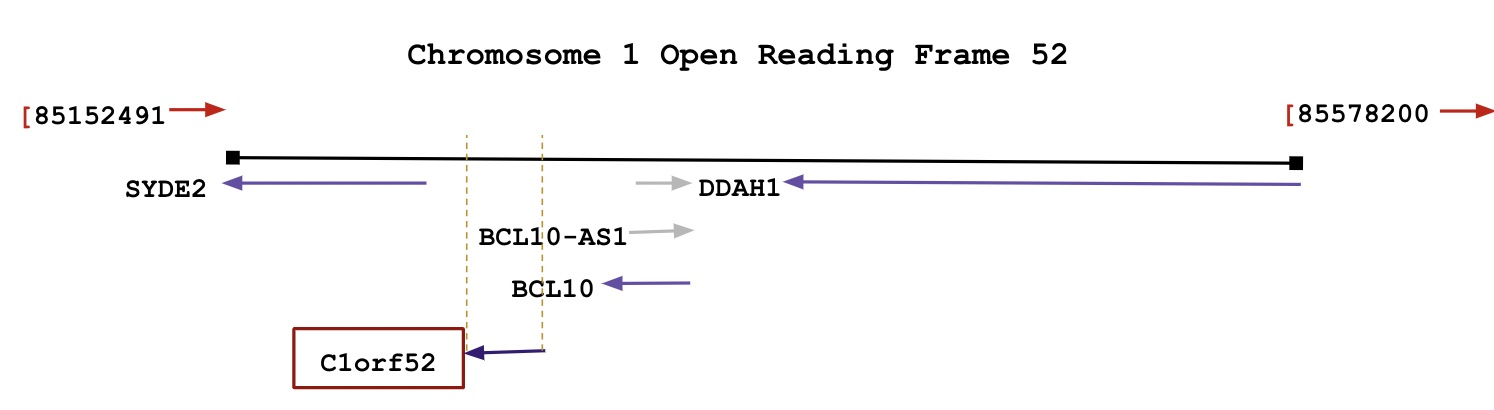
Human C1orf52 gene neighborhood. B-cell lymphoma 10 (BCL10), B-cell lymphoma antisense 1 (BCL-AS1), dimethylarginine dimethylaminohydrolase 1 (DDAH1), and synapse defective Rho GTPase homolog 2 (SYDE2) genes are located in close proximity to C1orf52 on chromosome 1.

The gene neighborhood of C1orf52 consists of B-cell lymphoma 10 (BCL10), B-cell lymphoma antisense 1 (BCL-AS1), dimethylarginine dimethylaminohydrolase 1 (DDAH1), and synapse defective Rho GTPase homolog 2 (SYDE2). The BCL10 gene encodes the BCL10 scaffolding protein that controls immune and pro-inflammatory pathways by connecting antigen receptor signaling to NF-kB activation in B cells and T cells. DDAH1 regulates intracellular ROS levels and apoptosis sensitivity via a SOD2-dependent pathway. SYDE2 converts Rho-type GTPases into an inactive guanosine diphosphate-bound state.

== Transcript ==
Including untranslated regions, the mRNA is 3254 nucleotides long.

=== Transcript variants ===
There is a transcript variant that includes an additional exon. This alternate exon in the coding region in variant 2 results in a frameshift and early stop codon. This transcript does not form the C1orf52 protein because the product is significantly truncated and the transcript is a candidate for nonsense-mediated decay.

Exons	1	2	3	4	Protein Length (amino acids)
Transcript Variant 1	306	-	199	2750	182
Transcript Variant 2	306	127	199	2750	none

== Protein ==
Conceptual translation of Human C1orf52. Splice sites between exons are indicated by blue text, the domain of unknown function (DUF4660) is in grey highlight, and pink text shows disordered regions.

The C1orf52 protein consists of 182 amino acids with a molecular weight of 20 kDa and an isoelectric point of 5 pI. The protein contains a domain of unknown function (DUF4660), also known as pFAM15559, that is 98 amino acids long. The domain of unknown function is flanked by two disordered regions, which make up the majority of the protein. Compared to other proteins, C1orf52 is lysine and histidine deficient as well as glutamine and proline rich.

No protein isoforms of C1orf52 have been reported.

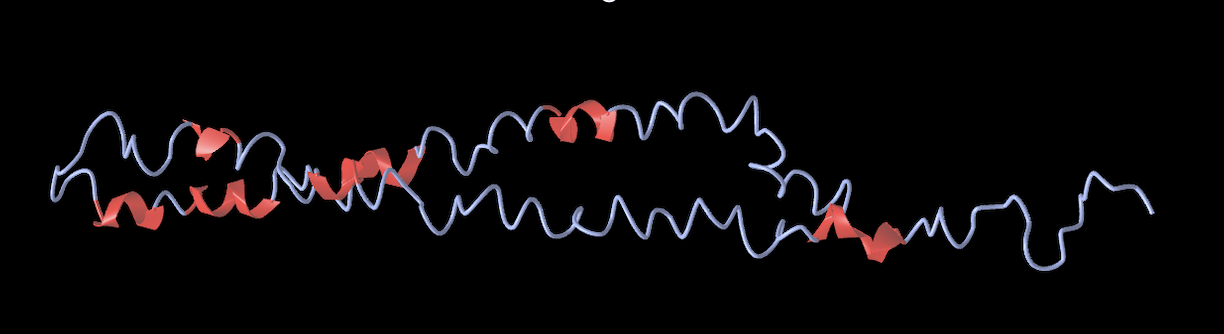
Human C1orf52 predicted tertiary structure labeled based on secondary structure. Alpha helixes are in red and coils are in grey.

=== Structure ===
There is a high amount of disorder in the secondary and tertiary protein structure, with very few predicted alpha helixes or beta sheets.

== Regulation ==
=== Gene ===
C1orf52 is ubiquitously expressed at high levels in human tissues, with higher abundance in bone marrow, brain regions, and immune organs (thymus and thyroid), with lower expression in digestive organs.

=== Protein ===
The C1orf52 protein has 21 times the average abundance in humans compared to other proteins. There are 3 phosphorylation sites identified through mass spectrometry. Within the cell, C1orf52 is localized to the nucleus and contains a bipartite nuclear localization signal.

== Homology ==
=== Paralogs ===
No paralogs of C1orf52 have been identified in the human genome.

=== Orthologs ===
C1orf52 orthologs are in all common classes of vertebrates. Orthologs are also in invertebrates including sponges, marine tunicate, and lancelets. Orthologs were not found in insects, fungi, plants or protists.

Genus and Species	Common Name	Taxonomic Order	Date of Divergence from Humans (MYA)	Assession Number	Sequence Length	Sequence Identity to Humans	Sequence Similarity to Humans
Homo Sapiens	Human	Primate	0	NP_932343.1	182	100%	100%
Mus musculus	House Mouse	Rodentia	87	NP_079831.1	180	85.2%	89.0%
Ornithorhynchus anatinus	Platypus	Monotreme	180	XP_028917768.1	191	61.7%	71.0%
Harpia harpyja	Harpy Owl	Accipitriformes	319	XP_052658103.1	183	64.6%	75.1%
Gallus gallus	Chicken	Galliformes	319	NP_001264489.2	183	63.0%	71.4%
Taeniopygia guttata	Zebra finch	Passeriformes	319	XP_030134956.3	183	62.1%	73.2%
Gopherus evgoodei	Goode's thornscrub tortoise	Testudines	319	XP_038601107.1	187	64.7%	73.3%
Alligator mississippiensis	Alligator	Crocodilia	319	XP_014450079.3	187	62.6%	70.5%
Protobothrops mucrosquamatus	Pit viper	Squamata	319	XP_015668904.1	187	61.5%	69.7%
Microcaecilia unicolor	Tiny Cayenne Caecilian	Gymnophiona	352	XP_030062820.1	184	62.2%	72.0%
Xenopus laevis	African clawed frog	Anura	352	NP_001089243.1	171	60.9%	70.8%
Pleurodeles waltl	Iberian ribbed newt	Urodela	352	KAJ1114225.1	182	57.1%	67.9%
Protopterus annectens	West African Lung Fish	Ceratodontiformes	408	XP_043941971.1	181	53.5%	70.1%
Polypterus senegalus	Gray bichir	Polypteriformes	429	XP_039591352	188	54.3%	64.5%
Danio rerio	Zebrafish	Cypriniformes	429	NP_956836.1	214	45.9%	58.3%
Pristis pectinata	Smalltooth Sawfish	Rhinopristiformes	462	XP_051869055.1	205	44.9%	58.9%
Lampetra fluviatilis	European river lamprey	Petromyzontiformes	563	CAL5931002.1	242	26.7%	36.0%
Branchiostoma floridae	Florida Lancelet	Amphioxiformes	581	XP_035684389.1	234	24.7%	37.7%
Styela clava	Sea squirt	Stolidobranchia	596	XP_039271545.1	236	25.4%	39.9%
Geodia barretti	Deep Sea Sponge	Tetractinellida	758	CAI8039110.1	221	27.1%	38.1%

=== Evolution ===
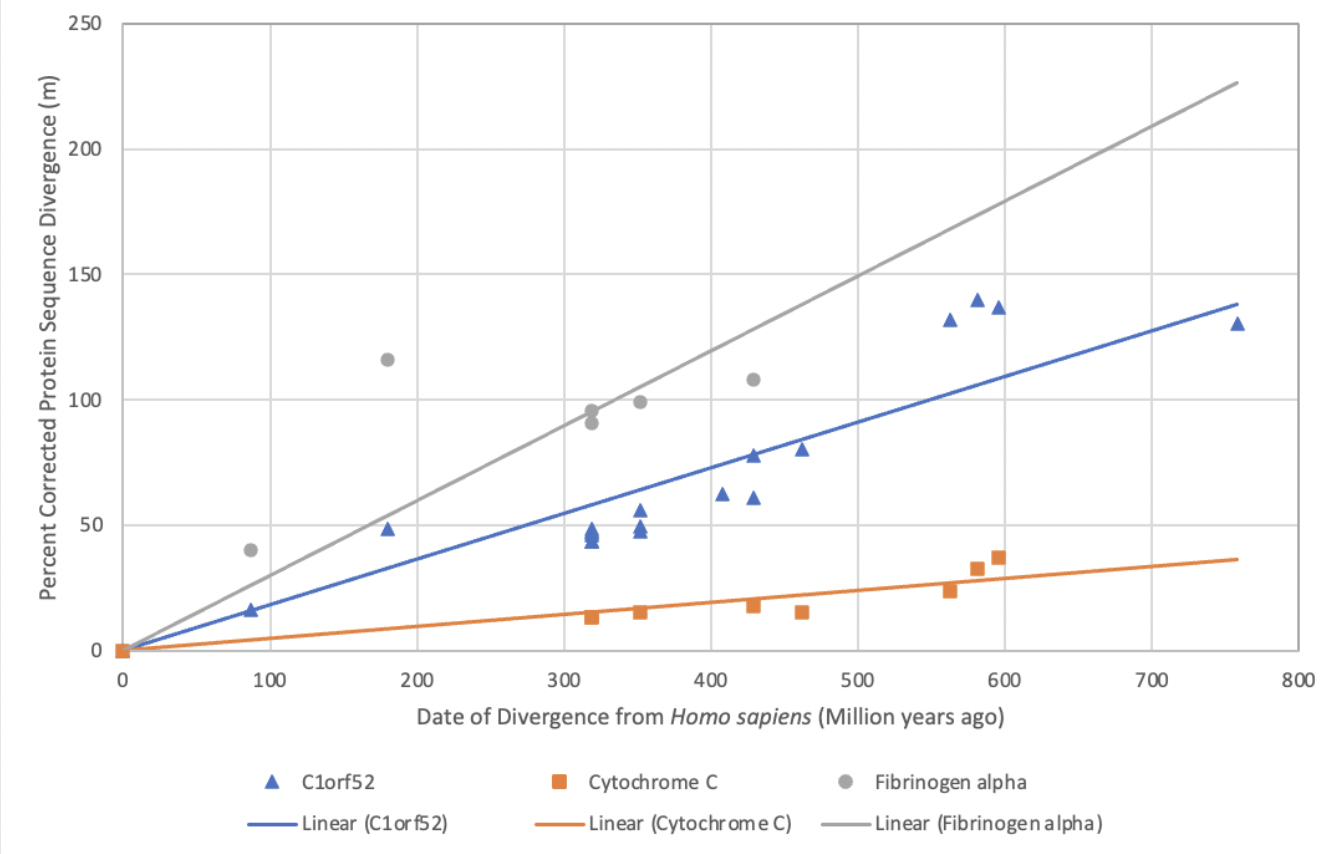
Mutation rate of C1orf52 in comparison to Cytochrome C and Fibrinogen Alpha. All organisms used for C1orf52 mutation rate are on the table. Organisms shown for Cytochrome C and Fibrinogen Alpha are: Mus musculus, Gallus gallus, Alligator mississippiensis, Xenopus laevis, Danio rerio. Additional organisms shown for Cytochrome C: Pristis pectinata, Lampetra fluviatilis, Branchiostoma floridae, Styela clava.

The C1orf52 gene appears most distantly in sea sponges which diverged from humans approximately 758 million years ago. C1orf52 evolves moderately quickly at a rate of 3.8 times faster than slowly evolving Cytochrome C and 0.61 times the rate of fast evolving Fibrinogen Alpha.

== Interacting proteins ==
High throughput affinity capture-mass spectrometry supports a physical association between C1orf52 and MAD1L1 (Mitotic Arrest Deficient 1 Like 1), DENN Domain Containing 2D (DENND2D), Differentially expressed in FDCP 6 homolog (DEF6), Insulin gene enhancer protein ISL2 (ISL2), and LIM/homeobox protein 4 (LHX4).

== Clinical Significance ==
Single nucleotide polymorphisms within the second intron of human C1orf52 have been linked to metabolic syndrome, high density lipoprotein cholesterol levels, response to levetiracetam in genetic generalized epilepsy, multiple sclerosis, body mass index, and protein quantitative trait (liver).
