= DEF6 =

Protein-coding gene in the species Homo sapiens

Identifiers
- Aliases: DEF6, IBP, SLAT, SWAP70L, guanine nucleotide exchange factor, DEF6 guanine nucleotide exchange factor, IMD87
- External IDs: OMIM: 610094; MGI: 1346328; GeneCards: DEF6

Gene location (Human)
Chr.	Chromosome 6 (human)
Band	6p21.31	Start	35,297,818 bp
Band	6p21.31	End	35,321,771 bp

Gene location (Mouse)
Chr.	Chromosome 17 (mouse)
Band	17|17 A3.3	Start	28,426,752 bp
Band	17|17 A3.3	End	28,447,582 bp
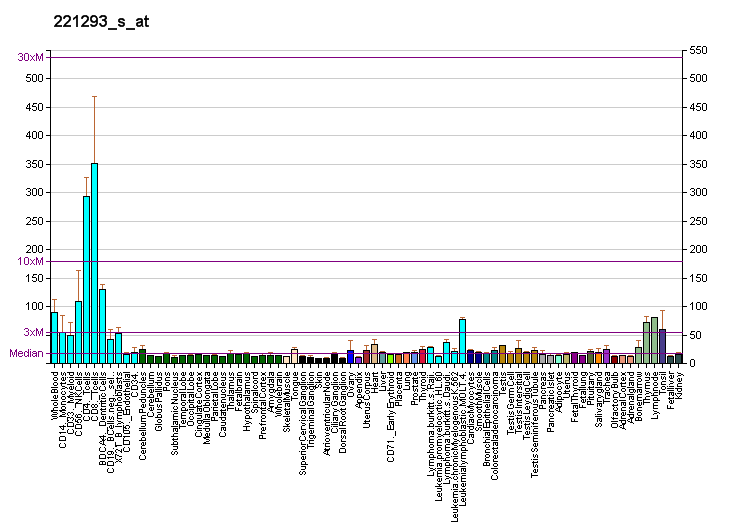
RNA expression pattern
Bgee	Human / Mouse (ortholog); Top expressed in: granulocyte; blood; monocyte; spleen; lymph node; skin of abdomen; appendix; skin of leg; body of pancreas; bone marrow / Top expressed in: thymus; granulocyte; mesenteric lymph nodes; submandibular gland; molar; lumbar spinal ganglion; bone marrow; stroma of bone marrow; spleen; lip; More reference expression data
BioGPS	More reference expression data
Orthologs
Databases	NCBI: entry; OMA: entry
Species	Human	Mouse
Entrez	50619	23853
Ensembl	ENSG00000023892	ENSMUSG00000002257
UniProt	Q9H4E7	Q8C2K1
RefSeq (mRNA)	NM_022047	NM_027185
RefSeq (protein)	NP_071330	NP_081461
Location (UCSC)	Chr 6: 35.3 – 35.32 Mb	Chr 17: 28.43 – 28.45 Mb
PubMed search
- Wikidata
View/Edit Human	View/Edit Mouse

Differentially expressed in FDCP 6 homolog is a protein that in humans is encoded by the DEF6 gene.
