= Latrophilin =

G-protein coupled receptor

Identifiers
- Symbol: Latrophilin
- Pfam: PF02354
- InterPro: IPR003334
Available protein structures:
- PDB: IPR003334 PF02354 (ECOD; PDBsum)
- AlphaFold: IPR003334; PF02354

EGF, latrophilin and seven transmembrane domain containing 1

Identifiers
- Symbol: ELTD1
- Alt. symbols: ETL
- NCBI gene: 64123
- HGNC: 20822
- RefSeq: NM_022159
- UniProt: Q9HBW9

Other data
- Locus: Chr. 1 p33-p32
Search for
- Structures: Swiss-model
- Domains: InterPro

latrophilin 1

Identifiers
- Symbol: LPHN1
- Alt. symbols: KIAA0821, CIRL1, LEC2
- NCBI gene: 22859
- HGNC: 20973
- RefSeq: NM_014921
- UniProt: O94910

Other data
- Locus: Chr. 19 p13.2
Search for
- Structures: Swiss-model
- Domains: InterPro

latrophilin 2

Identifiers
- Symbol: LPHN2
- Alt. symbols: LPHH1, KIAA0786, LEC1
- NCBI gene: 23266
- HGNC: 18582
- OMIM: 607018
- RefSeq: NM_012302
- UniProt: O95490

Other data
- Locus: Chr. 1 p31.1
Search for
- Structures: Swiss-model
- Domains: InterPro

latrophilin 3

Identifiers
- Symbol: LPHN3
- Alt. symbols: KIAA0768, LEC3
- NCBI gene: 23284
- HGNC: 20974
- RefSeq: NM_015236
- UniProt: Q9HAR2

Other data
- Locus: Chr. 4 q13.1
Search for
- Structures: Swiss-model
- Domains: InterPro

Latrophilins are a group of highly conserved G-protein coupled receptors from the adhesion G protein-coupled receptor family. These receptors were originally identified based on their ability to bind to a component of black widow spider venom known as alpha-latrotoxin. This conserved family of membrane proteins has up to three homologues in chordate species, including humans.

The precise functions of latrophilins remain unknown. Genetic defects in latrophilin genes have been associated with diseases such as attention-deficit hyperactivity disorder and cancer.

== Human proteins containing this domain ==
- Latrophilin 1 (LPHN1)
- Latrophilin 2 (LPHN2)
- Latrophilin 3 (LPHN3)

== See also ==
- ELTD1
