= AGBL4 =

Protein-coding gene in humans

Identifiers
- Aliases: AGBL4, CCP6, ATP/GTP binding protein-like 4, ATP/GTP binding protein like 4, AGBL carboxypeptidase 4
- External IDs: OMIM: 616476; MGI: 1918244; GeneCards: AGBL4
Enzyme activity
EC #	BRENDA	ExPASy	KEGG	MetaCyc
3.4.17.24	↗	↗	↗	↗

Gene location (Human)
Chr.	Chromosome 1 (human)
Band	1p33	Start	48,532,854 bp
Band	1p33	End	50,023,954 bp

Gene location (Mouse)
Chr.	Chromosome 4 (mouse)
Band	4|4 C7- D1	Start	110,254,858 bp
Band	4|4 C7- D1	End	111,521,521 bp
RNA expression pattern
Bgee	Human / Mouse (ortholog); Top expressed in: buccal mucosa cell; tendon of biceps brachii; testicle; gonad; prefrontal cortex; Brodmann area 23; primary visual cortex; Brodmann area 9; right frontal lobe; middle temporal gyrus / Top expressed in: spermatid; seminiferous tubule; choroid plexus of fourth ventricle; spermatocyte; choroidal fissure; primary visual cortex; Jacobson's organ; superior frontal gyrus; lumbar subsegment of spinal cord; substantia nigra; More reference expression data
BioGPS	n/a
Gene ontology
Molecular function	carboxypeptidase activity; tubulin binding; zinc ion binding; peptidase activity; hydrolase activity; metallopeptidase activity; metal ion binding; metallocarboxypeptidase activity
Cellular component	cytoplasm; ciliary basal body; centriole; cytosol; Golgi apparatus; cell projection; cytoskeleton
Biological process	C-terminal protein deglutamylation; protein side chain deglutamylation; proteolysis; protein deglutamylation; defense response to virus
Sources:Amigo / QuickGO
Orthologs
Databases	NCBI: entry; OMA: entry
Species	Human	Mouse
Entrez	84871	78933
Ensembl	ENSG00000186094	ENSMUSG00000061298
UniProt	Q5VU57	Q09LZ8
RefSeq (mRNA)	NM_032785; NM_001323573; NM_001323574; NM_001323575	NM_001048189; NM_001284190; NM_030231
RefSeq (protein)	NP_001310502; NP_001310503; NP_001310504; NP_116174	NP_001041654; NP_001271119; NP_084507
Location (UCSC)	Chr 1: 48.53 – 50.02 Mb	Chr 4: 110.25 – 111.52 Mb
PubMed search
- Wikidata
View/Edit Human	View/Edit Mouse

ATP/GTP binding protein like 4 is a protein that in humans is encoded by the AGBL4 gene.
