= AGAP1 =

Protein-coding gene in humans

Identifiers
- Aliases: AGAP1, AGAP-1, CENTG2, GGAP1, cnt-g2, ArfGAP with GTPase domain, ankyrin repeat and PH domain 1
- External IDs: OMIM: 608651; MGI: 2653690; GeneCards: AGAP1

Gene location (Human)
Chr.	Chromosome 2 (human)
Band	2q37.2	Start	235,494,043 bp
Band	2q37.2	End	236,131,800 bp

Gene location (Mouse)
Chr.	Chromosome 1 (mouse)
Band	1|1 D	Start	89,382,528 bp
Band	1|1 D	End	89,825,339 bp
RNA expression pattern
Bgee	Human / Mouse (ortholog); Top expressed in: frontal pole; paraflocculus of cerebellum; superior vestibular nucleus; sural nerve; inferior ganglion of vagus nerve; corpus callosum; pons; parietal lobe; postcentral gyrus; middle frontal gyrus / Top expressed in: neural layer of retina; Rostral migratory stream; inferior colliculi; entorhinal cortex; perirhinal cortex; ventromedial nucleus; arcuate nucleus; CA3 field; medulla oblongata; central gray substance of midbrain; More reference expression data
BioGPS	n/a
Gene ontology
Molecular function	nucleotide binding; GTP binding; phospholipid binding; metal ion binding; GTPase activator activity; GTPase activity
Cellular component	cytoplasm; nucleus
Biological process	protein transport; positive regulation of GTPase activity
Sources:Amigo / QuickGO
Orthologs
Databases	NCBI: entry; OMA: entry
Species	Human	Mouse
Entrez	116987	347722
Ensembl	ENSG00000157985	ENSMUSG00000055013
UniProt	Q9UPQ3	Q8BXK8
RefSeq (mRNA)	NM_001037131; NM_001244888; NM_014914	NM_001037136; NM_178119
RefSeq (protein)	NP_001032208; NP_001231817; NP_055729	NP_001032213; NP_835220
Location (UCSC)	Chr 2: 235.49 – 236.13 Mb	Chr 1: 89.38 – 89.83 Mb
PubMed search
- Wikidata
View/Edit Human	View/Edit Mouse

Arf-GAP with GTPase, ANK repeat and PH domain-containing protein 1 is an enzyme that in humans is encoded by the AGAP1 gene.

== Function ==
CENTG2 belongs to an ADP-ribosylation factor GTPase-activating (ARF-GAP) protein family involved in membrane traffic and actin cytoskeleton dynamics (Nie et al., 2002).[supplied by OMIM]

== HACNS1 ==
HACNS1 is located in an intron of the gene CENTG2 (also known as Human Accelerated Region 2). HACNS1 is hypothesized to be a gene enhancer "that may have contributed to the evolution of the uniquely opposable human thumb, and possibly also modifications in the ankle or foot that allow humans to walk on two legs". Evidence to date shows that of the 110,000 gene enhancer sequences identified in the human genome, HACNS1 has undergone the most change during the evolution of humans following the split with the ancestors of chimpanzees.
