= ADGRL4 =

Protein-coding gene in humans

Identifiers
- Aliases: ADGRL4, ETL, KPG_003, ELTD1, adhesion G protein-coupled receptor L4
- External IDs: OMIM: 616419; MGI: 2655562; GeneCards: ADGRL4

Gene location (Human)
Chr.	Chromosome 1 (human)
Band	1p31.1	Start	78,889,764 bp
Band	1p31.1	End	79,282,124 bp

Gene location (Mouse)
Chr.	Chromosome 3 (mouse)
Band	3|3 H3	Start	151,143,524 bp
Band	3|3 H3	End	151,250,723 bp
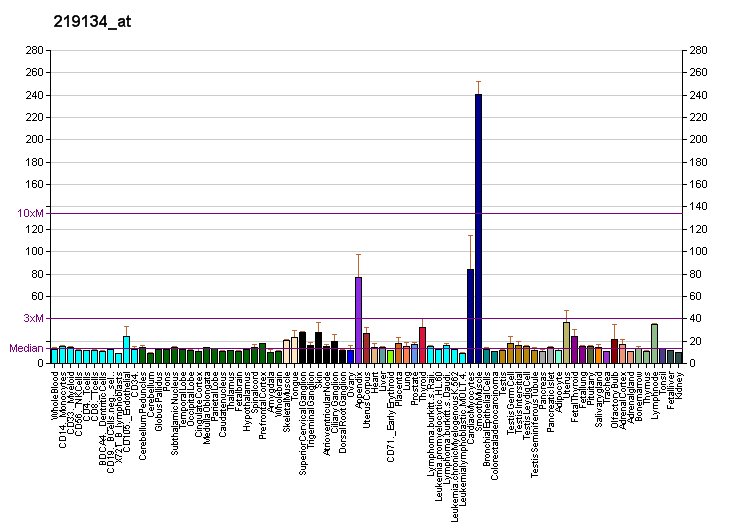
RNA expression pattern
Bgee	Human / Mouse (ortholog); Top expressed in: pericardium; visceral pleura; parietal pleura; subcutaneous adipose tissue; Achilles tendon; smooth muscle tissue; lower lobe of lung; gallbladder; vena cava; mammary gland / Top expressed in: right lung; zygote; interventricular septum; right lung lobe; myocardium of ventricle; soleus muscle; brown adipose tissue; right ventricle; endothelial cell of lymphatic vessel; right kidney; More reference expression data
BioGPS	More reference expression data
Gene ontology
Molecular function	calcium ion binding; G protein-coupled receptor activity; protein dimerization activity; transmembrane signaling receptor activity; signal transducer activity
Cellular component	integral component of membrane; plasma membrane; cytoplasmic vesicle; membrane; integral component of plasma membrane
Biological process	G protein-coupled receptor signaling pathway; cell surface receptor signaling pathway; signal transduction; adenylate cyclase-activating G protein-coupled receptor signaling pathway
Sources:Amigo / QuickGO
Orthologs
Databases	NCBI: entry; OMA: entry
Species	Human	Mouse
Entrez	64123	170757
Ensembl	ENSG00000162618	ENSMUSG00000039167
UniProt	Q9HBW9	Q923X1
RefSeq (mRNA)	NM_022159	NM_133222
RefSeq (protein)	NP_071442	NP_573485
Location (UCSC)	Chr 1: 78.89 – 79.28 Mb	Chr 3: 151.14 – 151.25 Mb
PubMed search
- Wikidata
View/Edit Human	View/Edit Mouse

Adhesion G protein-coupled receptor L4 is a latrophilin-like orphan receptor of the adhesion G protein-coupled receptor family. In humans this protein is encoded by the ADGRL4 gene. ADGRL4 appears to have a role in angiogenesis, both physiological and pathological in cancer.

== See also ==
- Latrophilin
