= SKAP2 =

Protein-coding gene in the species Homo sapiens

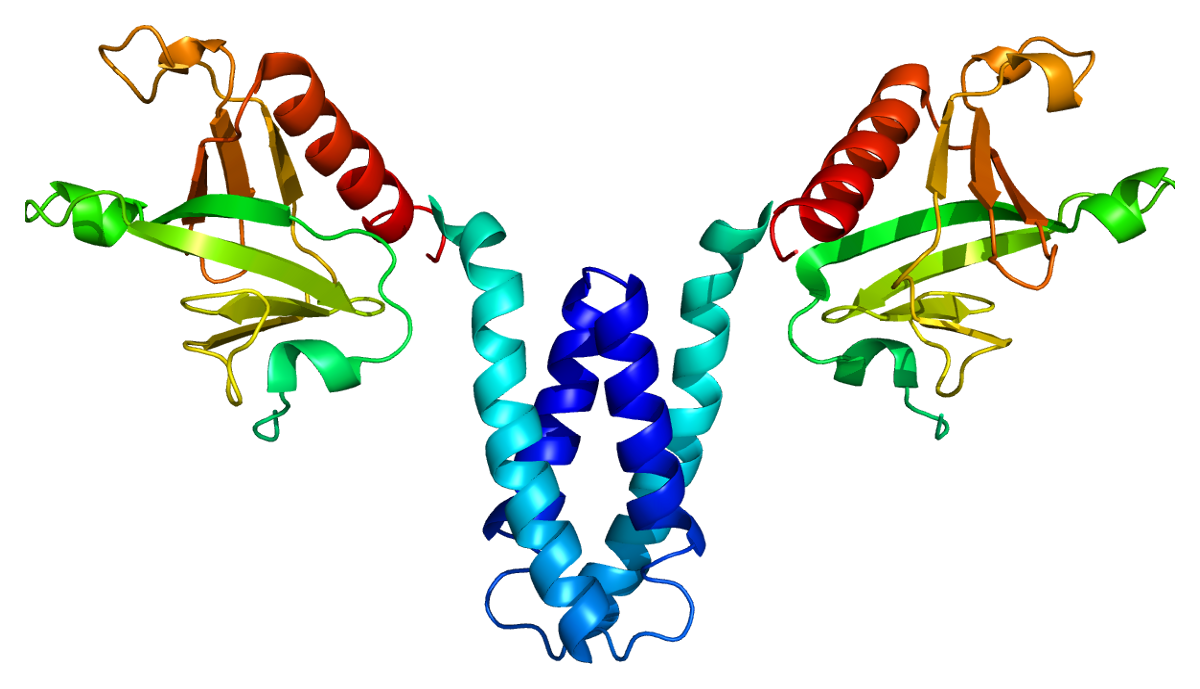

Identifiers
- Aliases: SKAP2, PRAP, RA70, SAPS, SCAP2, SKAP-HOM, SKAP55R, src kinase associated phosphoprotein 2
- External IDs: OMIM: 605215; MGI: 1889206; GeneCards: SKAP2
Available structures
PDB	Ortholog search: PDBe RCSB
PDB	List of PDB id codes 3OMH

Gene location (Human)
Chr.	Chromosome 7 (human)
Band	7p15.2	Start	26,667,068 bp
Band	7p15.2	End	26,995,239 bp

Gene location (Mouse)
Chr.	Chromosome 6 (mouse)
Band	6|6 B3	Start	51,834,402 bp
Band	6|6 B3	End	51,989,529 bp
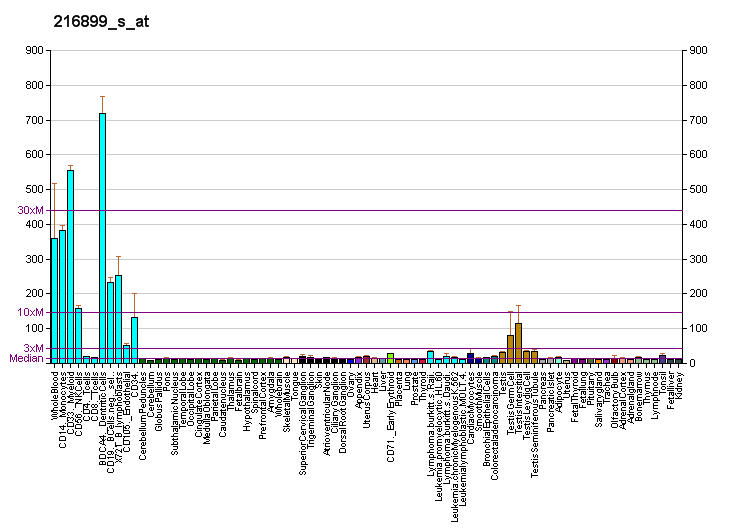

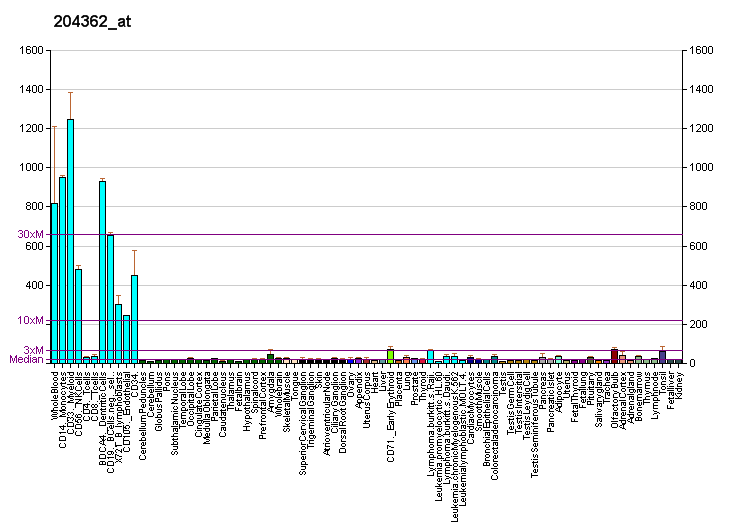

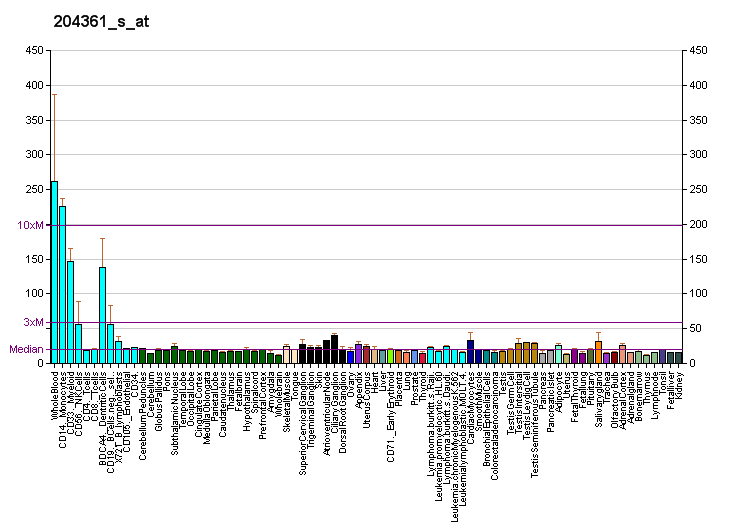
RNA expression pattern
Bgee	Human / Mouse (ortholog); Top expressed in: sperm; secondary oocyte; pericardium; monocyte; trabecular bone; visceral pleura; buccal mucosa cell; bone marrow cell; lower lobe of lung; pylorus / Top expressed in: zygote; granulocyte; secondary oocyte; stroma of bone marrow; blood; primary oocyte; primitive streak; ascending aorta; mesenteric lymph nodes; renal corpuscle; More reference expression data
BioGPS	More reference expression data
Gene ontology
Molecular function	protein binding
Cellular component	plasma membrane; cytoplasm; nucleoplasm; cytosol
Biological process	immune response-activating signal transduction; B cell activation; signal transduction; negative regulation of cell population proliferation; positive regulation of signal transduction; protein-containing complex assembly
Sources:Amigo / QuickGO
Orthologs
Databases	NCBI: entry; OMA: entry
Species	Human	Mouse
Entrez	8935	54353
Ensembl	ENSG00000005020	ENSMUSG00000059182
UniProt	O75563	Q3UND0
RefSeq (mRNA)	NM_003930; NM_001303468	NM_018773
RefSeq (protein)	NP_001290397; NP_003921	NP_061243
Location (UCSC)	Chr 7: 26.67 – 27 Mb	Chr 6: 51.83 – 51.99 Mb
PubMed search
- Wikidata
View/Edit Human	View/Edit Mouse

Src kinase-associated phosphoprotein 2 is an enzyme that in humans is encoded by the SKAP2 gene.

== Function ==
The protein encoded by this gene belongs to the src family kinases. This protein is similar to the src kinase associated phosphoprotein 1. It is an adaptor protein that is thought to play an essential role in the src signaling pathway in various cells, but particularly specific in macrophages. It inhibits PTK2B/RAFTK activity and regulates alpha-synuclein phosphorylation. It interacts with Signal-regulatory protein alpha and directs integrin-activated cytoskeletal reorganization in macrophages.
