= MAD1L1 =

Protein-coding gene in the species Homo sapiens

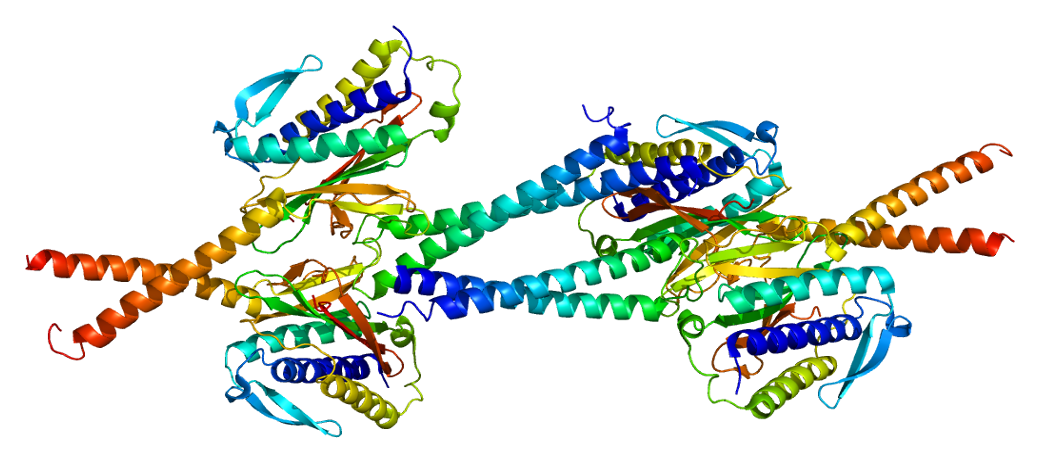
Available structures
PDB	Ortholog search: PDBe RCSB
PDB	List of PDB id codes 4DZO, 1GO4

Identifiers
- Aliases: MAD1L1, PIG9, TP53I9, TXBP181, MAD1, MAD1 mitotic arrest deficient like 1, mitotic arrest deficient 1 like 1
- External IDs: OMIM: 602686; MGI: 1341857; HomoloGene: 74500; GeneCards: MAD1L1; OMA:MAD1L1 - orthologs

Gene location (Human)
Chr.	Chromosome 7 (human)
Band	7p22.3	Start	1,815,793 bp
Band	7p22.3	End	2,233,243 bp

Gene location (Mouse)
Chr.	Chromosome 5 (mouse)
Band	5 G2|5 78.82 cM	Start	140,008,689 bp
Band	5 G2|5 78.82 cM	End	140,321,552 bp
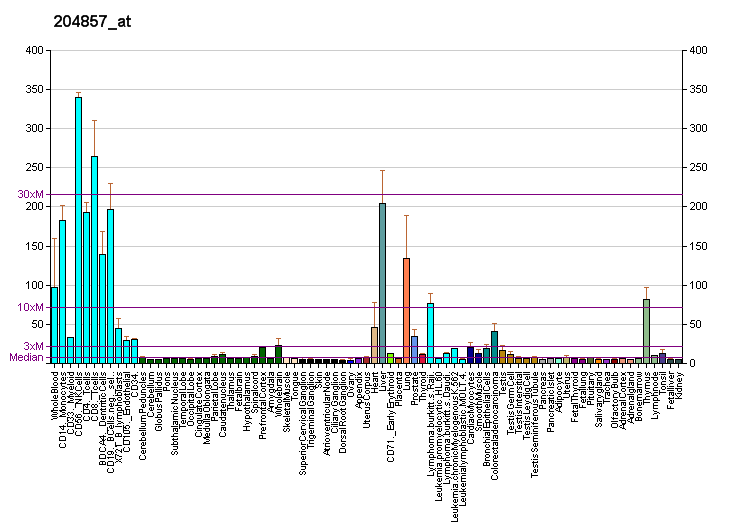
RNA expression pattern
Bgee	Human / Mouse (ortholog); Top expressed in: sural nerve; right testis; left testis; granulocyte; putamen; blood; right lobe of liver; caudate nucleus; gonad; primary visual cortex / Top expressed in: secondary oocyte; blastocyst; ventricular zone; zygote; neural layer of retina; thymus; morula; yolk sac; tail of embryo; dentate gyrus of hippocampal formation granule cell; More reference expression data
BioGPS	More reference expression data
Gene ontology
Molecular function	protein binding; kinetochore binding; identical protein binding
Cellular component	centrosome; spindle pole; spindle; nuclear pore; chromosome; microtubule organizing center; mitotic spindle; chromosome, centromeric region; cytoskeleton; kinetochore; cytoplasm; mitotic spindle pole; nuclear envelope; nucleus; cytosol; nuclear pore nuclear basket
Biological process	regulation of mitotic cell cycle phase transition; regulation of metaphase plate congression; mitotic cell cycle checkpoint signaling; thymus development; cell division; negative regulation of T cell proliferation; cell cycle; mitotic spindle assembly checkpoint signaling; attachment of mitotic spindle microtubules to kinetochore
Sources:Amigo / QuickGO
Orthologs
Species	Human	Mouse
Entrez	8379	17120
Ensembl	ENSG00000002822	ENSMUSG00000029554
UniProt	Q9Y6D9	Q9WTX8
RefSeq (mRNA)	NM_001013836; NM_001013837; NM_001304523; NM_001304524; NM_001304525 NM_003550	NM_010752; NM_001359025; NM_001359027
RefSeq (protein)	NP_001013858; NP_001013859; NP_001291452; NP_001291453; NP_001291454 NP_003541	NP_034882; NP_001345954; NP_001345956
Location (UCSC)	Chr 7: 1.82 – 2.23 Mb	Chr 5: 140.01 – 140.32 Mb
PubMed search
- Wikidata
View/Edit Human	View/Edit Mouse

Mitotic spindle assembly checkpoint protein MAD1 is a protein that in humans is encoded by the MAD1L1 gene.

MAD1L1 is also known as Human Accelerated Region 3. It may have played a key role in the evolution of humans from apes.

== Function ==
MAD1L1 is a component of the mitotic spindle-assembly checkpoint that prevents the onset of anaphase until all chromosome are properly aligned at the metaphase plate. MAD1L1 functions as a homodimer and interacts with MAD2L1. MAD1L1 may play a role in cell cycle control and tumor suppression. Some studies indicate associations of MAD1L1 with psychiatric disorders, including schizophrenia, bipolar disorder, and depression. Three transcript variants encoding the same protein have been found for this gene.

== Interactions ==
MAD1L1 has been shown to interact with:

- HDAC1,
- Histone deacetylase 2, and
- MAD2L1,

== See also ==
- MAD1
- MAD2
- Hyperphosphorylation
