= Human accelerated region 1 =

Segment of chromosome 20 in humans

Highly accelerated region 1A/1B
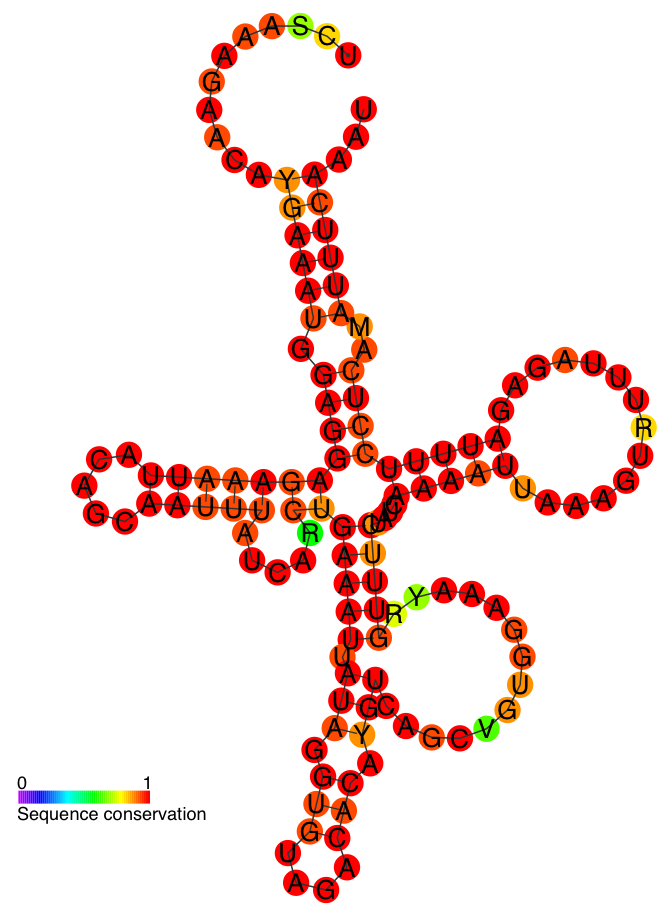
- Predicted secondary structure and sequence conservation of HAR1A

Identifiers
- Symbol: HAR1A
- Rfam: RF00635

Other data
- RNA type: Gene; lncRNA
- Domain: Eukaryota;
- SO: SO:0001463
- PDB structures: PDBe

In molecular biology, Human Accelerated Region 1 (Highly Accelerated Region 1, HAR1) is a segment of the human genome found on the long arm of chromosome 20. It is a human accelerated region. It is located within a pair of overlapping long non-coding RNA genes, HAR1A (HAR1F) and HAR1B (HAR1R).

== HAR1A ==
HAR1A is expressed in Cajal–Retzius cells, contemporaneously with the protein reelin.

HAR1A was identified in August 2006 when human accelerated regions (HARs) were first investigated. These 49 regions represent parts of the human genome that differ significantly from highly conserved regions of our closest ancestors in terms of evolution. Many of the HARs are associated with genes known to play a role in neurodevelopment. One particularly altered region, HAR1, was found in a stretch of genome with no known protein-coding RNA sequences. Two RNA genes, HAR1F and HAR1R, were identified partly within the region. The RNA structure of HAR1A has been shown to be stable, with a secondary structure unlike those previously described.

HAR1A is active in the developing human brain between the 7th and 18th gestational weeks. It is found in the dorsal telencephalon in fetuses. In adult humans, it is found throughout the cerebellum and forebrain; it is also found in the testes. There is evidence that HAR1 is repressed by REST in individuals with Huntington's disease, perhaps contributing to the neurodegeneration associated with the disease.

Further work on the secondary structure of HAR1A has suggested that the human form adopts a different fold to that of other mammals exemplified by the chimpanzee sequence.

== HAR1B ==
The HAR1B gene overlaps HAR1A, and is located on the opposite strand of the chromosome. Its expression in the human brain is lower than that of HAR1A.

== See also ==
- Non-coding RNA
