= VIGR =

VIGR may refer to:

- Gwalior Airport
- GPR157, GPCR receptor
