= GPR157 =

Protein-coding gene in humans

Identifiers
- Aliases: GPR157, G protein-coupled receptor 157
- External IDs: MGI: 2442046; GeneCards: GPR157

Gene location (Human)
| Chr. | Chromosome 1 (human) |
| Band | 1p36.22 | Start | 9,100,305 bp |
| Band | 1p36.22 | End | 9,129,102 bp |

Gene location (Mouse)
| Chr. | Chromosome 4 (mouse) |
| Band | 4|4 E2 | Start | 150,171,822 bp |
| Band | 4|4 E2 | End | 150,190,384 bp |
RNA expression pattern
| Bgee | Human / Mouse (ortholog); Top expressed in: vastus lateralis muscle; skin of arm; gums; gingival epithelium; Skeletal muscle tissue of biceps brachii; oral cavity; Skeletal muscle tissue of rectus abdominis; skin of thigh; tibialis anterior muscle; nasal epithelium / Top expressed in: muscle of thigh; quadriceps femoris muscle; muscle tissue; skeletal muscle tissue; granulocyte; lip; heart; zone of skin; yolk sac; esophagus; More reference expression data |
| BioGPS | n/a |
Gene ontology
| Molecular function | transmembrane signaling receptor activity; signal transducer activity; G protein-coupled receptor activity |
| Cellular component | integral component of membrane; plasma membrane; membrane; ciliary membrane; cell projection |
| Biological process | cell surface receptor signaling pathway; signal transduction; G protein-coupled receptor signaling pathway; circadian behavior; positive regulation of cytosolic calcium ion concentration involved in phospholipase C-activating G protein-coupled signaling pathway; radial glial cell differentiation; multicellular organism development; cell differentiation |
Sources:Amigo / QuickGO
Orthologs
| Databases | NCBI: entry; OMA: entry |
| Species | Human | Mouse |
| Entrez | 80045 | 269604 |
| Ensembl | ENSG00000180758 | ENSMUSG00000047875 |
| UniProt | Q5UAW9 | Q8C206 |
| RefSeq (mRNA) | NM_024980 | NM_177366 |
| RefSeq (protein) | NP_079256 | NP_796340 |
| Location (UCSC) | Chr 1: 9.1 – 9.13 Mb | Chr 4: 150.17 – 150.19 Mb |
| PubMed search |
- Wikidata
| View/Edit Human | View/Edit Mouse |

Probable G-protein coupled receptor 157 is a protein that in humans is encoded by the GPR157 gene.
