= DFL23916 =

Identifiers
- IUPAC name: 7-[3-[(4-fluoro-2-methyl-5-phenylphenyl)sulfamoyl]phenyl]heptanoic acid
- PubChem CID: 134247381

Chemical and physical data
- Formula: C_{26}H_{28}FNO_{4}S
- Molar mass: 469.57 g·mol^{−1}
- 3D model (JSmol): Interactive image
- SMILES: CC1=CC(=C(C=C1NS(=O)(=O)C2=CC=CC(=C2)CCCCCCC(=O)O)C3=CC=CC=C3)F
- InChI: InChI=1S/C26H28FNO4S/c1-19-16-24(27)23(21-12-6-4-7-13-21)18-25(19)28-33(31,32)22-14-9-11-20(17-22)10-5-2-3-8-15-26(29)30/h4,6-7,9,11-14,16-18,28H,2-3,5,8,10,15H2,1H3,(H,29,30); Key:VDGLRVBSCZCZGY-UHFFFAOYSA-N

DFL23916 is an experimental drug which acts as a mixed agonist for the free fatty acid receptors FFAR1 (GPR40) and FFAR4 (GPR120). Unlike the older drug GW9508 which is selective for FFAR1, DFL23916 has a balanced efficacy at both receptor targets. It increases GLP-1 secretion and improved glucose homeostasis in mice.
