= TST =

TST may stand for:

== Science and technology ==
- Ternary search tree, in computer science
- Transition state theory, of chemical reaction rates
- TST (gene)
- Tuberculin skin test
- Tectonic strain theory, in geology
- Total sleep time
- Total station theodolite, instrument used for surveying and building construction
- Typed set theory, in mathematical logic
- Transgressive systems tract, in sequence stratigraphy (geology)
- Tail suspension test, stress test for rats
- Team selection test
- TEST (x86 instruction), short form for the TEST assembly instruction

== Places ==
- Tsim Sha Tsui, an urbanized area in Hong Kong
  - Tsim Sha Tsui station, a railway station there
- Trang Airport in Thailand (IATA airport code)

== Organisations and groups ==
- Telesta Therapeutics, Toronto Stock Exchange symbol
- TheStreet.com, NASDAQ trading symbol
- Toronto School of Theology, Canada
- TST-CF Express, Canadian LTL freight carrier formerly known as TST Overland Express
- Tribunal Superior do Trabalho, (Superior Labor Court), Brazilian federal courts
- The Satanic Temple, nontheistic religious and human rights organization
- Sheng Kung Hui Tsang Shiu Tim Secondary School, a school in Hong Kong

== Other ==
- .TST, ExamView file extension
- Tolley, Scott & Tolley, Australian winemakers
- Top Secret (band), a former name of South Korean band TST
- The Soccer Tournament, a sports tournament
- Taiwan Standard Time, the standard time zone used in Taiwan (UTC+8)
