= C13H18O2 =

The molecular formula C_{13}H_{18}O_{2} (molar mass: 206.28 g/mol, exact mass: 206.1307 u) may refer to:

- Ibuprofen
- Dexibuprofen
- Hexyl benzoate
- Setogepram
