= Naim Akhtar Khan =

Indian-born French physiologist (born 1959)

- Born: June 30, 1959 (age 67); India
- Known for: Research on fat taste receptors and obesity
- Scientific career
- Fields: Physiology
- Workplaces: University of Burgundy

Naim Akhtar Khan (born June 30, 1959, in India) is a French physiologist and professor at the University of Burgundy, Dijon, France. He leads the research team, Nutrition Physiology & Toxicology (NUTox).

== Biography ==
Khan obtained his Master's degree in 1979 and completed his PhD at the age of 24. He conducted postdoctoral research at the AIIMS and AMU in India. After a brief research stint in 1987 at the Institut Für Immunologie, Munich, Germany, he moved to Mexico for a postdoctoral fellowship in neuroimmunology at the National Institute for Neurology and Neurosurgery. In 1988, he relocated to Rennes, France, for a second doctorate in neuro-oncology, focusing on the transmembrane transport of polyamines. Khan was awarded his Habilitation à diriger des recherches in 1995 and became a university professor in Dijon in 1997.

== Career ==
Khan began his teaching career in 1993 as a lecturer in Limoges, France, working on "Fundamental and Comparative Immunology." In 2003, he was appointed as director of the Department of Physiology, Immunology, and Neurosciences at the University of Burgundy. His research led to the publication of significant results in 2014 on the characterization of fat taste receptors, contributing to the development of chemical compounds that mimic fat taste, reducing food intake in obese subjects. These compounds target the CD36 and GPR120 receptors on the tongue.

In 2019, Khan filed two European patents in the Innovation category. In 2021, he co-founded the company "EktaH", focusing on developing new therapeutic solutions to combat obesity. In 2022, he joined the Outreach and Engagement Committee of the International Science Council, and in 2023, he was appointed a Fellow of the Academy of the IUPS.

== Research ==
Naim Khan's research team, NUTox, has made contributions to understanding the physiological mechanisms of fat taste perception, particularly in relation to obesity. The cornerstone of their research is the concept that while lifestyle modifications such as a low-calorie diet or increased physical activity are traditional interventions for obesity, they often fail in the long term due to humans' genetic, cultural, or socio-economic preference for fatty foods, which provide hedonic pleasure through their taste.

To address this, Khan's team has focused on the study of fat taste receptors, particularly the CD36 and GPR120 receptors located in the taste buds. They have developed several fatty acid analogues known as "lipid decoys." These compounds mimic the taste of fats more intensely than natural dietary fatty acids, thereby binding to the tongue's fat taste receptors and inducing early satiety. This reaction leads to a reduction in the consumption of fat-rich foods and, consequently, body weight in obese models.

In another study, they demonstrated that a GPR120 agonist, TUG-891, can activate the tongue-brain-intestine axis, responsible for the secretion of anorexigenic peptides, which suppress appetite. Furthermore, some of their lipid decoys have shown strong anti-inflammatory activity in various in vitro and in vivo models, adding another layer of therapeutic potential to their research.

== Awards and recognition ==
- 2009: Innolec in Neurobiology by Masaryk University, Czech Republic
- 2012: Robert Naqué Prize from the Society of Physiology, France
- 2020: Nutrition & Food Prize from the National Academy of Medicine, France

== Mandates ==
- Professor of Physiology at the University of Burgundy
- Director of the NUTox team
- Founding member of the African Society of Physiology and Physopathology
- Co-founder of EktaH
