= Liminal BioSciences =

Liminal BioSciences Inc.
- Type: Private
- Traded as: Nasdaq: LMNL (2020-23)
- Industry: Biopharmaceutical; Pharmaceutical
- Founded: October 14, 1994; 32 years ago
- Headquarters: 440 Boul. Armand-Frappier Suite 300, Laval, Québec, Canada
- Owner: Thomvest Asset Management
- Website: liminalbiosciences.com

Liminal BioSciences Inc., formerly known as Prometic Life Sciences Inc., is a Canadian biopharmaceutical company.

== History ==
- Liminal was founded in 1988, as a commercial spinoff of research at the University of Cambridge on affinity chromatography. Its founder was the current President and CEO, Pierre Laurin, whose research formed the basis for the company's products. Liminal was incorporated on October 14, 1994 under the Canada Business Corporations Act, or the CBCA, under the name Innovon Life Sciences Holdings Limited.
- In August 2016, the company announced the acquisition of Telesta Therapeutics.
- It changed its name to “Prometic Life Sciences Inc.” on May 19, 1998 and subsequently rebranded to “Liminal BioSciences Inc.” on October 3, 2019. On July 28, 1998, the Company's common shares began trading on the Toronto Stock Exchange, or the TSX, under the trading symbol “PLI” and, on October 7, 2019, began trading under the trading symbol “LMNL.”
- On November 18, 2019, Liminal's common shares began trading on the Nasdaq Global Market, or the Nasdaq, under the trading symbol “LMNL.”
- On August 5, 2020, it voluntarily delisted its common shares from the TSX. On May 19, 1998, the Corporation went public through a listing on the Toronto Stock Exchange.
- In September 2023, the company was taken private by Thomvest Asset Management Ltd. and delisted from Nasdaq.

== Business ==
Liminal BioSciences' development programs target seven transmembrane G protein-coupled receptors (GPCRs), where the receptor protein passes through the cell membrane seven times. These receptors are easily accessible to hydrophilic drugs due to their presence on the cell surface, and their non-uniform expression enables selectivity in modulating physiological processes. Agonists and antagonists of 7TM GPCRs receptors are utilized for treating various diseases in all organ systems. An agonist is a drug that binds to a target and mimics the action of the natural ligand. An antagonist is a drug that binds to a receptor and prevents other molecules (such as the natural ligand) from binding.

Liminal BioSicences' drug discovery platform leverages fully integrated chemistry and biology expertise supported by broad in-vivo capabilities, allowing it to investigate preclinical drug candidates’ efficacy based on a wide variety of animal models, enabling the development of small-molecule therapeutic candidates for the treatment of various metabolic, inflammatory and fibrotic diseases.

Liminal BioSciences is a development stage biopharmaceutical company focused on discovering and developing novel and distinctive small molecule therapeutics that modulate G protein-coupled receptors, or GPCR, pathways. The Company is designing proprietary novel small molecule therapeutic candidates with the intent of developing therapeutics for the treatment of metabolic, inflammatory and fibrotic diseases with significant unmet medical needs.

Liminal BioSciences' pipeline is currently made up of three development programs. The candidate selected for clinical development, LMNL6511, a selective antagonist for the GPR84, is expected to commence a Phase 1 clinical trial in the second half of 2023. The Company is also developing potential OXER1 antagonists and FFAR1 (GPR40) agonists, both of which are at the preclinical stage. In addition to these priority development programs.

== Controversies ==
From early 2018 to early 2019, Prometic Life Sciences' Share price dropped 79%. The company's sought permission from the Toronto Stock Exchange to proceed without a shareholder vote for reasons of "financial hardship". In October 2019, the company allowed its shareholders to vote on a name change.
