= GPR120 compound A =

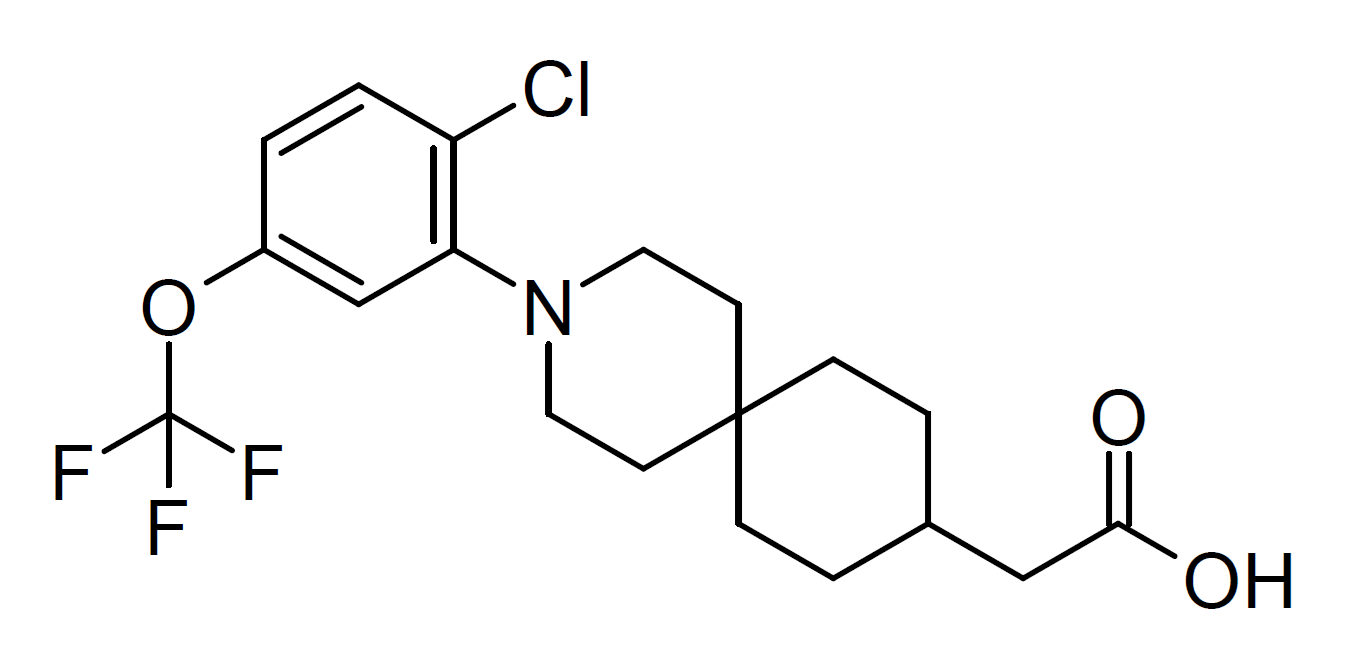

Identifiers
- IUPAC name: 2-[3-[2-chloro-5-(trifluoromethoxy)phenyl]-3-azaspiro[5.5]undecan-9-yl]acetic acid
- CAS Number: 1599477-75-4
- PubChem CID: 73777063
- IUPHAR/BPS: 8418
- ChemSpider: 35033244
- ChEMBL: ChEMBL3919973

Chemical and physical data
- Formula: C_{19}H_{23}ClF_{3}NO_{3}
- Molar mass: 405.84 g·mol^{−1}
- 3D model (JSmol): Interactive image
- SMILES: C1CC2(CCC1CC(=O)O)CCN(CC2)C3=C(C=CC(=C3)OC(F)(F)F)Cl
- InChI: InChI=1S/C19H23ClF3NO3/c20-15-2-1-14(27-19(21,22)23)12-16(15)24-9-7-18(8-10-24)5-3-13(4-6-18)11-17(25)26/h1-2,12-13H,3-11H2,(H,25,26); Key:WUJVPELCYCESAP-UHFFFAOYSA-N

GPR120 compound A is an experimental drug which acts as a potent and highly selective agonist for the free fatty acid receptor FFAR4 (GPR120). It has antiinflammatory effects and regulates glucose homeostasis and insulin release. It has been researched in animal models of diabetes. GPR120 compound A has also been referred to as GPR120 agonist III but this has also been used in some papers to refer to the older compound TUG-891, which may cause confusion about which drug was used if the chemical structure or other unique identifiers are not specifically stated.
