= GW-1100 =

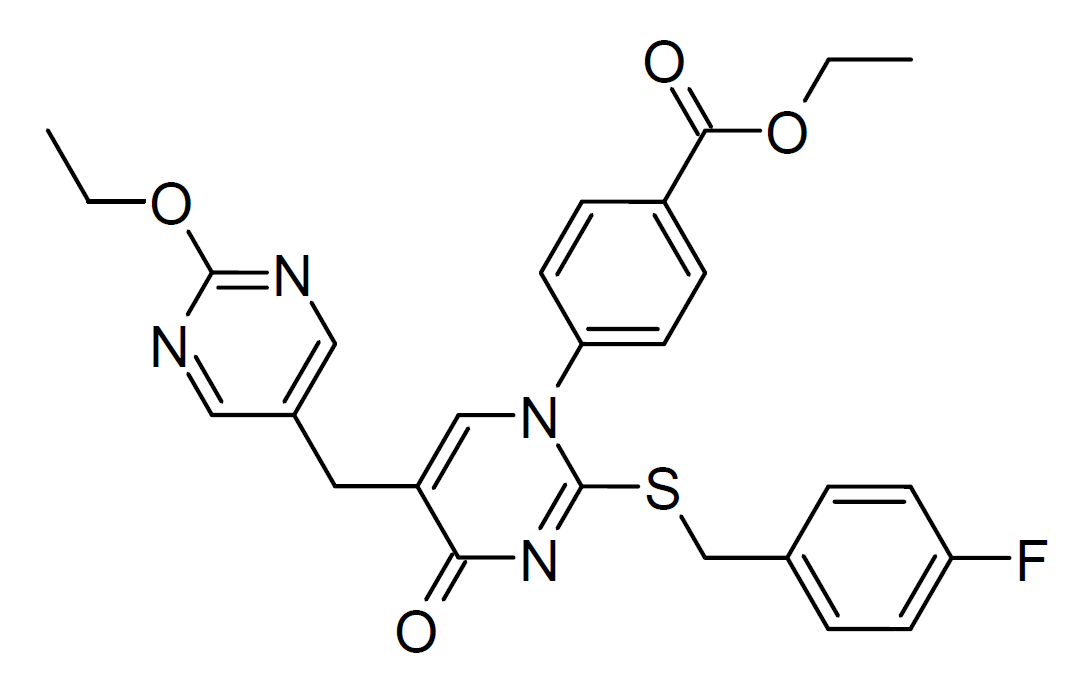

Identifiers
- IUPAC name: ethyl 4-[5-[(2-ethoxypyrimidin-5-yl)methyl]-2-[(4-fluorophenyl)methylsulfanyl]-4-oxopyrimidin-1-yl]benzoate
- CAS Number: 306974-70-9
- PubChem CID: 11692123
- IUPHAR/BPS: 1057
- ChemSpider: 9866850
- ChEMBL: ChEMBL4303679
- CompTox Dashboard (EPA): DTXSID80470686

Chemical and physical data
- Formula: C_{27}H_{25}FN_{4}O_{4}S
- Molar mass: 520.58 g·mol^{−1}
- 3D model (JSmol): Interactive image
- SMILES: CCOC1=NC=C(C=N1)CC2=CN(C(=NC2=O)SCC3=CC=C(C=C3)F)C4=CC=C(C=C4)C(=O)OCC
- InChI: InChI=1S/C27H25FN4O4S/c1-3-35-25(34)20-7-11-23(12-8-20)32-16-21(13-19-14-29-26(30-15-19)36-4-2)24(33)31-27(32)37-17-18-5-9-22(28)10-6-18/h5-12,14-16H,3-4,13,17H2,1-2H3; Key:PTPNCCWOTBBVJR-UHFFFAOYSA-N

GW-1100 (GW1100) is an experimental drug which acts as a potent and selective antagonist for the free fatty acid receptor FFAR1 (GPR40). Agonists for this receptor have potentially useful antiinflammatory and anti-fibrotic effects, and while GW-1100 does not have therapeutic effects in its own right, it is important for research into the FFAR1 receptor as it allows comparison testing to measure the effectiveness of FFAR1 agonists. GW-1100 also showed inhibition of cancer cell growth in vitro, suggesting potential applications of FFAR1 antagonists in the treatment of cancer.
