= AP8 =

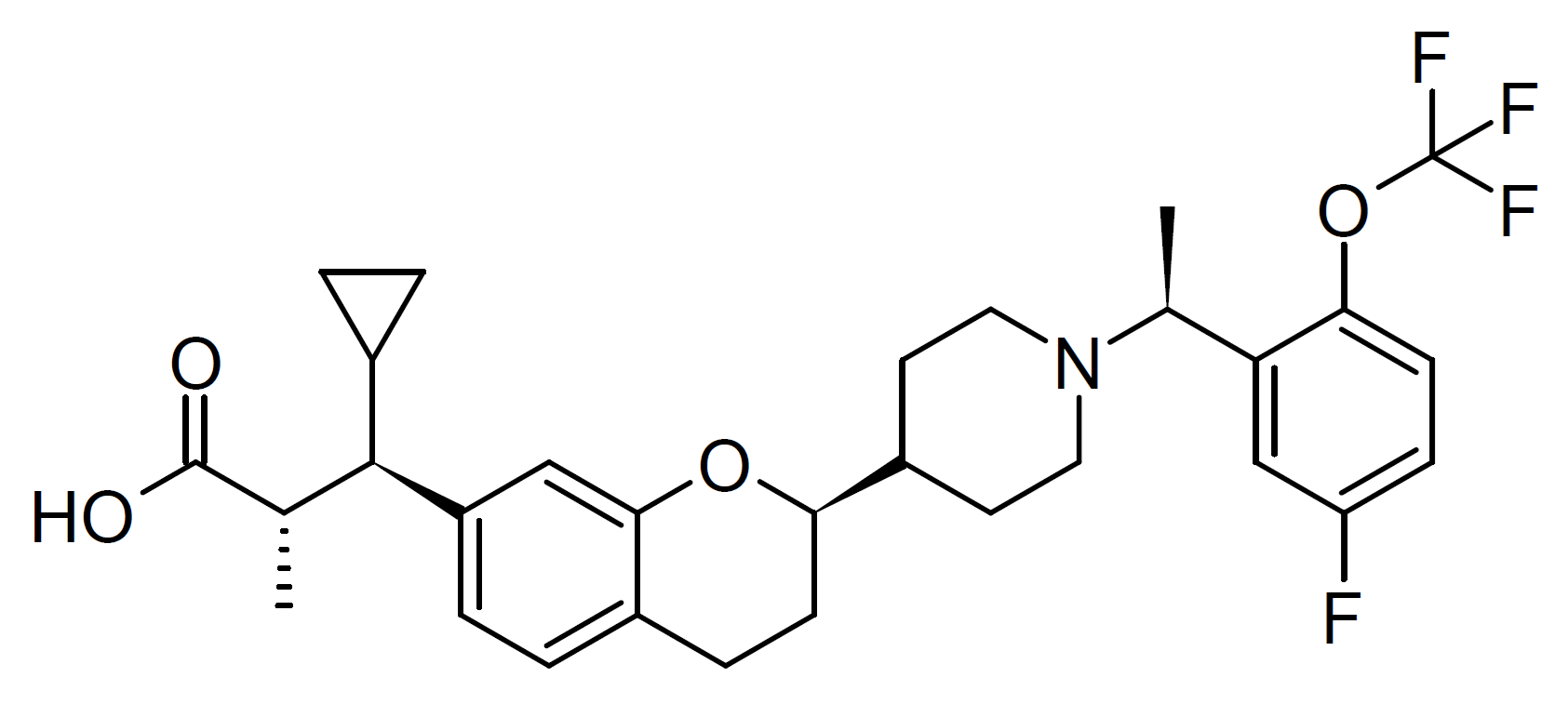

Identifiers
- IUPAC name: (2S,3R)-3-cyclopropyl-3-[(2R)-2-[1-[(1S)-1-[5-fluoro-2-(trifluoromethoxy)phenyl]ethyl]piperidin-4-yl]-3,4-dihydro-2H-chromen-7-yl]-2-methylpropanoic acid
- PubChem CID: 127053597
- ChemSpider: 61712481

Chemical and physical data
- Formula: C_{30}H_{35}F_{4}NO_{4}
- Molar mass: 549.607 g·mol^{−1}
- 3D model (JSmol): Interactive image
- SMILES: C[C@@H](C1=C(C=CC(=C1)F)OC(F)(F)F)N2CCC(CC2)[C@H]3CCC4=C(O3)C=C(C=C4)[C@H](C5CC5)[C@H](C)C(=O)O
- InChI: InChI=1S/C30H35F4NO4/c1-17(29(36)37)28(21-4-5-21)22-6-3-19-7-9-25(38-27(19)15-22)20-11-13-35(14-12-20)18(2)24-16-23(31)8-10-26(24)39-30(32,33)34/h3,6,8,10,15-18,20-21,25,28H,4-5,7,9,11-14H2,1-2H3,(H,36,37)/t17-,18-,25+,28-/m0/s1; Key:ADYYYLTWZYYGNX-LJYIQKJHSA-N

AP8 is an experimental drug which acts as a selective agonist for the free fatty acid receptor FFAR1 (GPR40). It has antiinflammatory and anti-fibrotic effects.
