= HD-6277 =

HD-6277 is a selective g-protein-coupled receptor 40 agonist developed by Hyundai Pharmaceutical to treat diabetes.
