= Downtown Youngstown =

Central business district of Youngstown, Ohio

Coordinates: 41°6′N 80°39′W

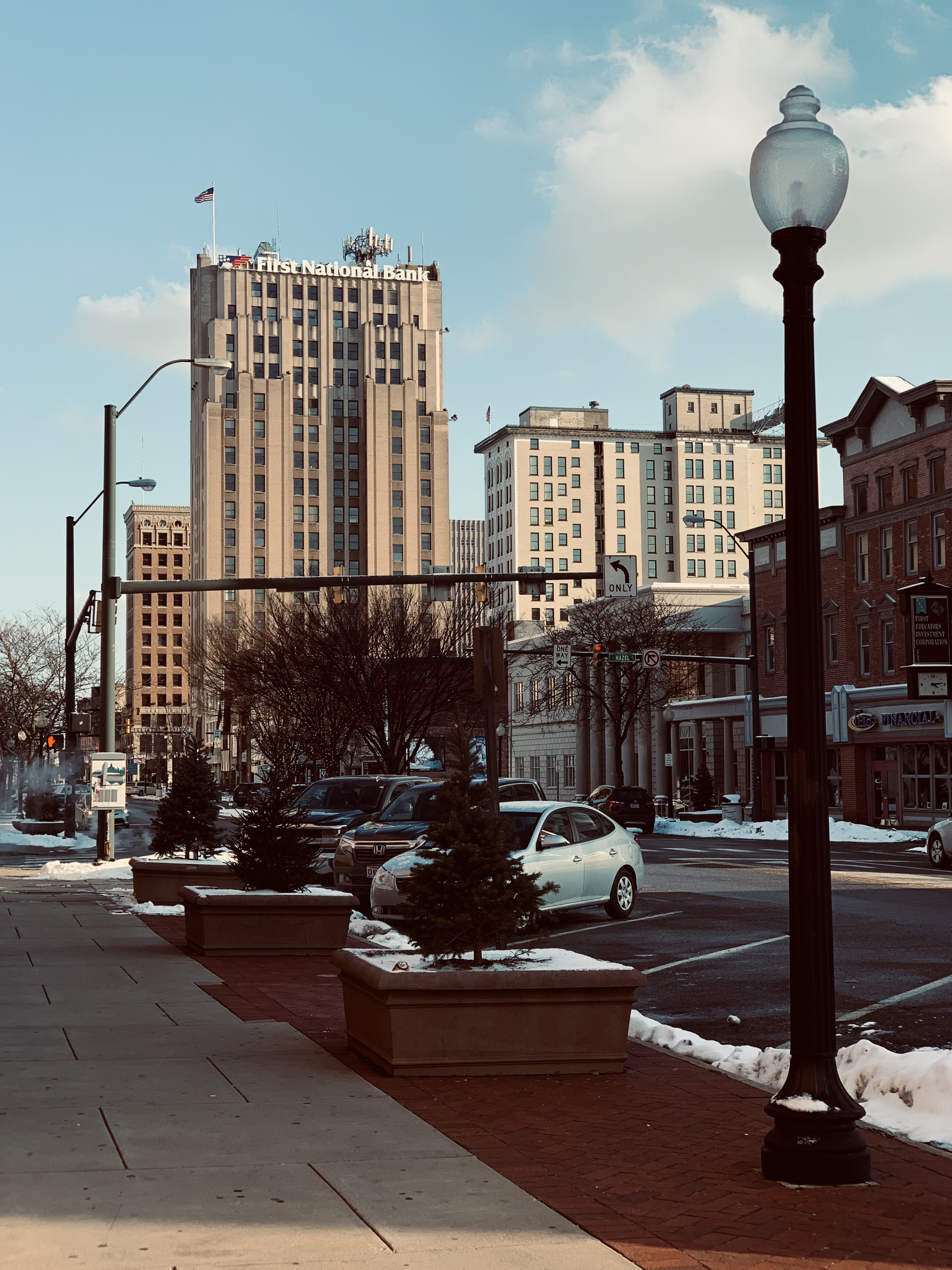
Downtown Youngstown, facing east on West Federal Street

Downtown Youngstown is the urban downtown center of Youngstown, Ohio, United States. Located on the north bank of the Mahoning River, Downtown Youngstown is the site of most of the city's government buildings and banks. A number of entertainment venues are also located in downtown, including the Covelli Centre, Powers Auditorium, the DeYor Performing Arts Center, and Youngstown Foundation Amphitheatre. In addition, the downtown sits to the immediate south of notable cultural and educational resources, including Youngstown State University, the Butler Institute of American Art, and the McDonough Museum of Contemporary Art.

== History ==
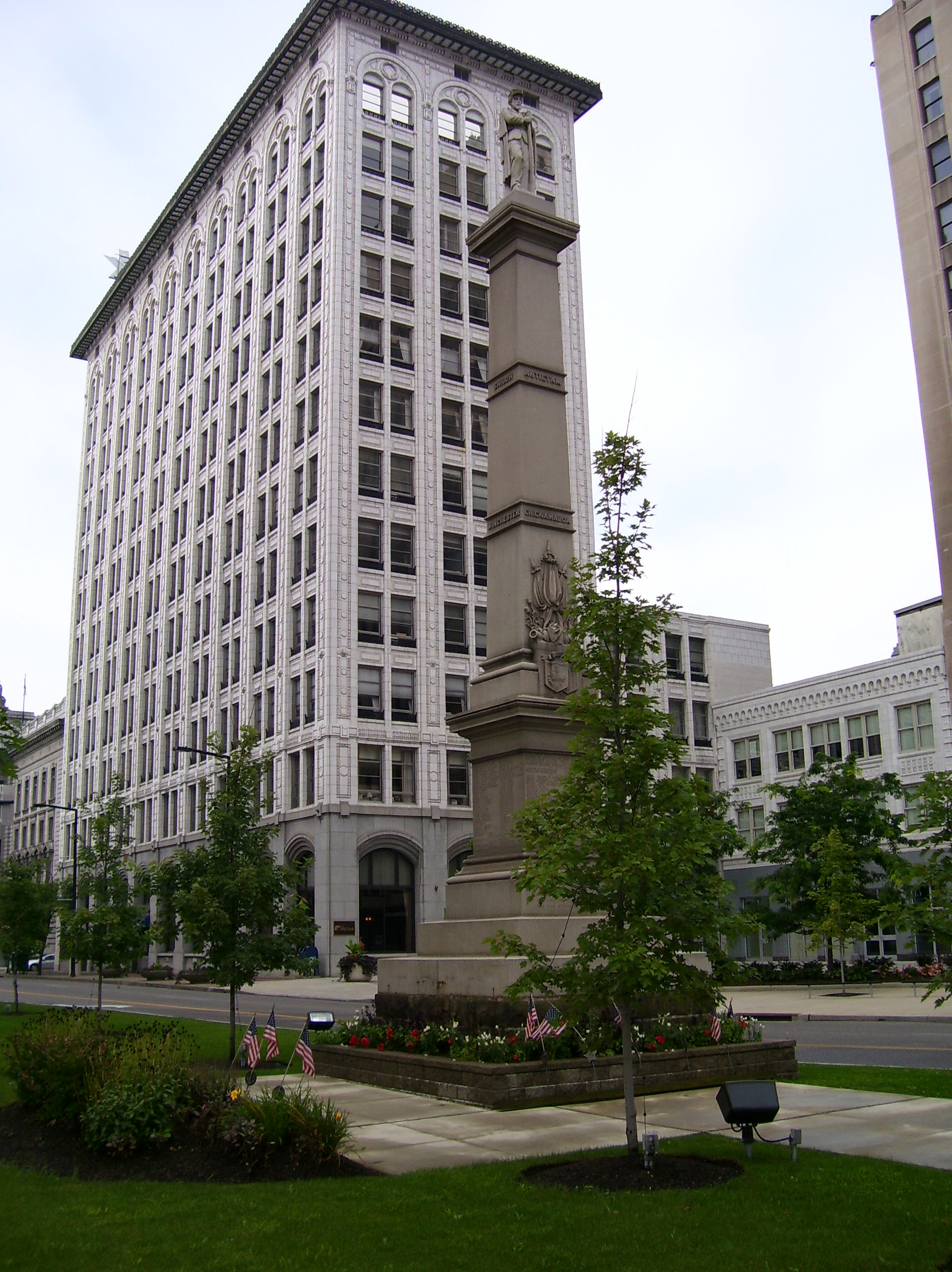
The Man on the Monument Civil War Memorial at Federal Plaza

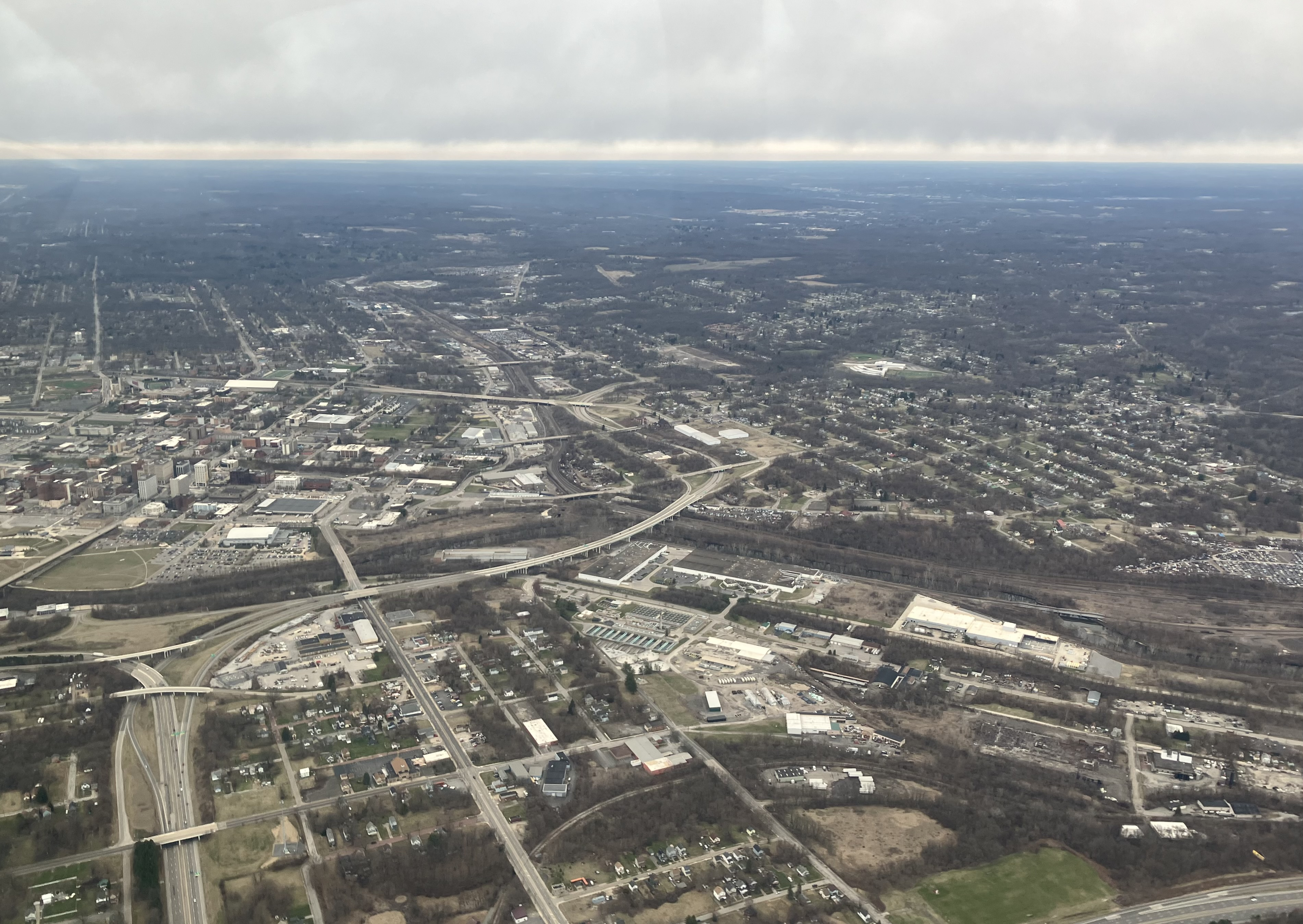
Downtown Youngstown from 2000ft above the ground

Youngstown's traditional downtown area fell into steep decline in the 1970s and early 1980s. Amid the departure of retail businesses along the main thoroughfare of West Federal Street, municipal officials decided to close the street to vehicle traffic in order to build a pedestrian-oriented shopping area. By the mid-1980s, most of the downtown area's department stores and movie theaters had closed up. Meanwhile, the city's car dealerships relocated in the suburbs. By the early 1990s, the downtown had become a stark symbol of the community's economic decline.

In the 2000s, additions included the Nathaniel R. Jones Federal Building and U.S. Courthouse in 2002 (which features an award-winning design by the architectural firm, Robert A. M. Stern Architects), the Mahoning County Children's Services center and George Voinovich Government Center in 2004, and both the Covelli Centre and Ohio Seventh District Court of Appeals in 2006.

In 2005, Federal Street, a major downtown thoroughfare that was closed off to create a pedestrian-oriented plaza, reopened to traffic. The downtown area has seen the razing of structurally unsound buildings and the expansion or restoration of others. New construction has dovetailed with efforts to cultivate business growth. One of the area's more successful business ventures in recent years has been the Youngstown Business Incubator. This nonprofit organization, based in a former downtown department store building, fosters the growth of fledgling technology-based companies. The incubator, which boasts more than a dozen business tenants, recently completed construction on the Taft Technology Center, where some of its largest tenants will locate their offices.

While the city has been less successful in drawing large retail businesses back to the downtown, older buildings are being refurbished for smaller businesses, while others have been razed to make way for new buildings. The downtown is currently the site of the Covelli Centre, which has given Youngstown a professional hockey team.

== Economy ==
Youngstown State University is the largest employer in the city. Steelite, a British ceramics manufacturer, has its U.S. headquarters based in Youngstown. Other companies with offices downtown include JPMorgan Chase, FNB Corporation, Huntington Bancshares, KeyBank, PNC Bank, InfoCision, and the Youngstown Business Incubator. The United States Postal Service has a distribution center downtown.

The Youngstown Business Incubator (YBI), in the heart of downtown, houses several start-up technology companies that have received office space, furnishings, and access to utilities. Some Incubator-supported companies have earned recognition, and a few are starting to outgrow their current space. Inc. Magazine rated one such company–Turning Technologies–as the fastest-growing privately held software company in the United States and 18th fastest-growing privately held company overall. To keep such companies downtown, the YBI secured approval to demolish a row of nearby vacant buildings to clear space for expansion.

The Stambaugh building, which once housed the Youngstown Sheet and Tube headquarters was renovated into a 4-star DoubleTree by Hilton hotel in 2018.
