= AH-7614 =

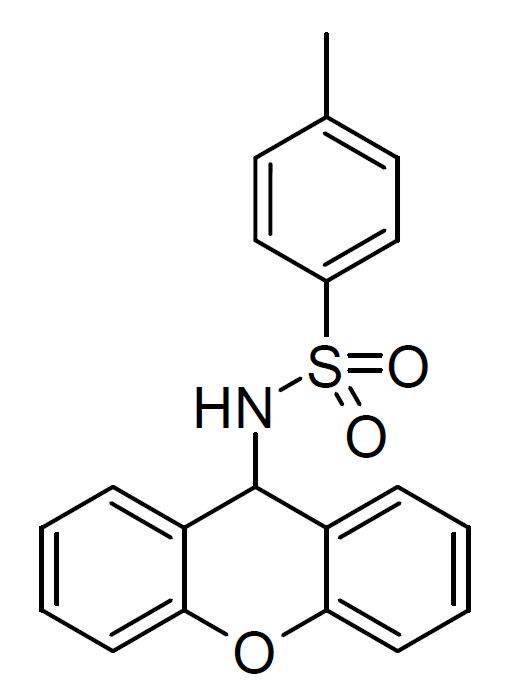

Identifiers
- IUPAC name: 4-methyl-N-(9H-xanthen-9-yl)benzenesulfonamide
- CAS Number: 6326-06-3
- PubChem CID: 233085
- ChemSpider: 203203
- ChEMBL: ChEMBL3311302

Chemical and physical data
- Formula: C_{20}H_{17}NO_{3}S
- Molar mass: 351.42 g·mol^{−1}
- 3D model (JSmol): Interactive image
- SMILES: CC1=CC=C(C=C1)S(=O)(=O)NC2C3=CC=CC=C3OC4=CC=CC=C24
- InChI: InChI=1S/C20H17NO3S/c1-14-10-12-15(13-11-14)25(22,23)21-20-16-6-2-4-8-18(16)24-19-9-5-3-7-17(19)20/h2-13,20-21H,1H3; Key:OZCQEUZTOAAWDK-UHFFFAOYSA-N

AH-7614 is an experimental drug which acts as a potent and selective antagonist for the free fatty acid receptor FFAR4 (GPR120), though it has also been described as an inverse agonist or negative allosteric modulator. Agonists of FFAR4 have antiinflammatory effects and are of interest in the treatment of various conditions including diabetes and obesity, and as a selective FFAR4 antagonist AH-7614 is important for research into the function of this receptor.
