= Free fatty acid receptor 4 =

Protein-coding gene in the species Homo sapiens

FFAR4

Identifiers
- Aliases: FFAR4, BMIQ10, GPR120, GPR129, GT01, O3FAR1, PGR4, free fatty acid receptor 4
- External IDs: OMIM: 609044; MGI: 2147577; GeneCards: FFAR4

Gene location (Human)
Chr.	Chromosome 10 (human)
Band	10q23.33	Start	93,566,665 bp
Band	10q23.33	End	93,604,480 bp

Gene location (Mouse)
Chr.	Chromosome 19 (mouse)
Band	19|19 C2	Start	38,085,519 bp
Band	19|19 C2	End	38,102,711 bp
RNA expression pattern
Bgee	Human / Mouse (ortholog); Top expressed in: mucosa of sigmoid colon; mucosa of transverse colon; rectum; anterior pituitary; islet of Langerhans; gonad; adipose tissue; subcutaneous adipose tissue; granulocyte; prefrontal cortex / Top expressed in: brown adipose tissue; embryo; right lung lobe; white adipose tissue; large intestine; subcutaneous adipose tissue; colon; embryo; left colon; mammary gland; More reference expression data
BioGPS	n/a
Gene ontology
Molecular function	peptide binding; signal transducer activity; taste receptor activity; fatty acid binding; lipid binding; G protein-coupled receptor activity
Cellular component	integral component of membrane; membrane; endocytic vesicle; integral component of plasma membrane; plasma membrane
Biological process	hormone secretion; negative regulation of apoptotic process; response to peptide; cellular response to hormone stimulus; positive regulation of ERK1 and ERK2 cascade; regulation of glucose transmembrane transport; negative regulation of inflammatory response; fat cell differentiation; signal transduction; G protein-coupled receptor signaling pathway; detection of chemical stimulus involved in sensory perception of taste; positive regulation of cold-induced thermogenesis
Sources:Amigo / QuickGO
Orthologs
Databases	NCBI: entry; OMA: entry
Species	Human	Mouse
Entrez	338557	107221
Ensembl	ENSG00000186188	ENSMUSG00000054200
UniProt	Q5NUL3	Q7TMA4
RefSeq (mRNA)	NM_001195755; NM_181745	NM_181748
RefSeq (protein)	NP_001182684; NP_859529	NP_861413
Location (UCSC)	Chr 10: 93.57 – 93.6 Mb	Chr 19: 38.09 – 38.1 Mb
PubMed search
- Wikidata
View/Edit Human	View/Edit Mouse

Free Fatty acid receptor 4 (FFAR4), also termed G-protein coupled receptor 120 (GPR120), is a protein that in humans is encoded (i.e., its formation is directed) by the FFAR4 gene. This gene is located on the long (i.e. "q") arm of chromosome 10 at position 23.33 (position notated as 10q23.33). G protein-coupled receptors (also termed GPRs or GPCRs) reside on their parent cells' surface membranes, bind any one of the specific set of ligands that they recognize, and thereby are activated to trigger certain responses in their parent cells. FFAR4 is a rhodopsin-like GPR in the broad family of GPRs which in humans are encoded by more than 800 different genes. It is also a member of a small family of structurally and functionally related GPRs that include at least three other free fatty acid receptors (FFARs) viz., FFAR1 (also termed GPR40), FFAR2 (also termed GPR43), and FFAR3 (also termed GPR41). These four FFARs bind and thereby are activated by certain fatty acids.

FFAR4 protein is expressed in a wide range of cell types. Studies conducted primarily on human and rodent cultured cells and in animals (mostly rodents) suggest that FFAR4 acts in these cells to regulate many normal bodily functions such as food preferences, food consumption, food tastes, body weight, blood sugar (i.e., glucose) levels, inflammation, atherosclerosis, and bone remodeling. Studies also suggest that the stimulation or suppression of FFAR4 alters the development and progression of several types of cancers. In consequence, agents that activate or inhibit FFAR4 may be useful for treating excessive fatty food consumption, obesity, type 2 diabetes, pathological inflammatory reactions, atherosclerosis, atherosclerosis-induced cardiovascular disease, repair of damaged bones, osteoporosis. and some cancers. These findings have made FFAR4 a potentially attractive therapeutic biological target for treating these disorders and therefore lead to the development of drugs directed at regulating FFAR4's activities.

Certain fatty acids, including in particular the omega-3 fatty acids, docosahexaenoic and eicosapentaenoic acids, have been taken in diets and supplements to prevent or treat the diseases and tissue injuries that recent studies suggest are associated with abnormalities in FFAR4's functions. It is now known that these fatty acids activate FFAR4. While dietary and supplemental omega-3 fatty acids have had little or only marginal therapeutic effects on these disorders (see health effects of omega-3 fatty acid supplementation), many drugs have been found that are more potent and selective in activating FFAR4 than the omega-3 fatty acids and one drug is a potent inhibitor of FFAR4. This raised a possibility that the drugs may be more effective in treating these disorders and prompted initial studies testing the effectiveness of them in disorders targeted by the omega-3 fatty acids. These studies, which are mostly preclinical studies on cultured cells or animal models of disease with only a few preliminary clinical studies, are reviewed here.

== FFAR genes ==
The genes for FFAR1, FFAR2, and FFAR3 are located close to each other on the short (i.e., "p") arm of chromosome 19 at position 13.12 (location notated as 19p13.12); the FFAR4 gene is located on the "q" (i.e., long) arm of chromosome 10 at position 23.33 (location notated as 10q23.33). Humans express a long FFAR4 protein isoform consisting of 377 amino acids and a short splice variant protein isoform consisting of 361 amino acids. However, rodents, non-human primates, and other studied animals express only the short protein. The two isoforms operate through different cell-stimulating pathways to elicit different responses. Furthermore, humans express the long FFAR4 protein only in their colon and colon cancer tissues. The consequences of these differences for the studies reported here have not been determined.

== Activators and inhibitors of the free fatty acid receptors ==
FFARs are activated by certain straight-chain fatty acids. FFAR2 and FFAR3 are activated by short-chain fatty acids, i.e., fatty acid chains consisting of 2 to 5 carbon atoms, mainly acetic, butyric, and propionic acids. FFAR1 and FFAR4 are activated by 1) medium-chain fatty acids i.e., fatty acids consisting of 6-12 carbon atoms such as capric and lauric acids; 2) long-chain unsaturated fatty acids consisting of 13 to 21 carbon atoms such as myristic and steric acids; 3) monounsaturated fatty acids such as oleic and palmitoleic acids; and 4) polyunsaturated fatty acids such as the omega-3 fatty acids alpha-linolenic, eicosatrienoic, eicosapentaenoic, and docosahexaenoic acids or omega-6 fatty acids such as linoleic, gamma-linolenic, dihomo-gamma-linolenic, arachidonic, and docosatetraenoic acids. Docosahexaenoic and eicosapentaenoic acid are commonly regarded as the main dietary fatty acids that activate FFAR4. Since all of the FFAR1- and FFAR4-activating fatty acids have similar potencies in activating FFAR4 and FFAR1 and have FAR-independent means of influencing cells, it can be difficult to determine if their actions involve FFAR4, FFAR1, both FFARs, or FFAR-independent mechanisms.

The drugs which stimulate (i.e., are agonists of) FFAR4 include: GW9508 (the first discovered and most studied FFAR agonist is about 60-fold more potent in activating FFAR1 than FFAR4; it is often used to implicate FFAR4 functions in cells that naturally or after manipulation express no or very low FFAR1 levels); TUG-891 (almost 300-fold more potent in activating FFAR4 than FFAR1 in human cells but only modestly more potent on FFAR4 than FFAR1 in mouse cells); TUG-1197 (activates FFAR4 but not FFAR1); metabolex 36 (about 100-fold more potent in activating FFAR4 than FFAR1); GSK137647A (about 50-fold more potent in activating FFAR4 than FFAR1); compound A (Merck & Co.) and compound B (CymaBay Therapeutics) (both potently activate FFAR4 with negligible effects on FFAR1); and GPR120 III (2,000-fold more active on FFAR4 than FFAR1). AH-7614 acts as a negative allosteric modulator to inhibit FFAR4; it is >100-fold more potent in inhibiting FFAR4 than FFAR1 and the only currently available FFAR4 antagonist that inhibits FFAR4. Most of the studies reported to date have examined the effects of two FFAR4 agonists, GW9508 and TUG-891, that have been available far longer than the other listed drugs.

== Cells and tissues expressing FFAR4 ==
FFAR4 is expressed in a wide variety of tissues and cell types but its highest levels of expression are in certain intestinal cells (i.e., enteroendocrine K and I cells), taste bud cells, fat cells, respiratory epithelium cells in the lung (i.e., club cells also termed clara cells), and macrophages. It is less strongly expressed in other cell types including: various immune cells besides macrophages, cells in brain, heart, and liver tissues, skeletal muscle cells, blood vessel endothelial cells, enteroendocrine L cells of the gastrointestinal tract, delta cells in the islets of the pancreas, cells involved in bone development and remodeling, some cells in the arcuate nucleus and nucleus accumbens of the hypothalamus, and in some types of cancer cells. However, in comparing animal to human studies the cells and tissues that express FFAR4 can differ and many of these studies have measured FFAR4 messenger RNA (mRNA) but not the product directed to be made by this mRNA, FFRA4 protein. The significance of these issues requires study.

== FFAR4 functions and activities ==
=== Fat tissue development and thermogenesis ===
The two forms of fat cells, i.e., white and brown fat cells, develop from precursor stem cells. Brown fat cells promote thermogenesis, i.e., the generation of body heat. Studies have reported that: 1) FFAR4 levels rose in the fat tissues of mice exposed to cold; 2) TUG‐891 and GW9508 stimulated 3T3-L1 mouse stem-like cells to mature into fat cells; 3) mice lacking a functional ffar4 gene (i.e., ffar4 knockout mice; ffar4 is the term for the mouse equivalent to the human FFAR4 gene) had fewer brown fat cells in their subcutaneous adipose (i.e. fat) tissues in response to cold exposure, were cold intolerant, and had poor survival rates in cold temperatures; 4) GW9508 stimulated increases in the brown fat tissue of normal mice; however, in ffar4 gene knockout mice it simulated histology, i.e., microscopic, changes in fat tissue suggesting that thermogenesis was impaired; 5) TUG-891 stimulated cultured mouse fat cells to oxidize fatty acids (this oxidation underlies the development of body heat in the non-shivering form of thermogenesis); and 6) FFAR1 has not yet been reported to be expressed in the fat tissue of mice or humans. These studies suggest that FFAR4 contributes to the proliferation of brown fat cells and thermogenesis in mice. Studies are needed to determine if FFAR4 has a similar role in humans.

=== Obesity ===
Two rodent studies suggested that FFAR4 functions to limit excessive weight gains: FFAR4 deficient mice developed obesity and mice treated with the FFAR4 agonist, TUG-891, lost fat tissue. FFAR4 might play a similar obesity-suppressing role in humans. One study found that FFAR4 mRNA and protein levels were lower in the visceral fat tissues (i.e., fat around internal organs) of obese than lean individuals. However, another study found that the expression of FFAR4 mRNA was higher in the subcutaneous and omental fat tissues of obese than lean individuals. Similarly, one study reported that Europeans who carried a single-nucleotide variant of the FFAR4 gene which encoded a dysfunctional FFAR4 protein (it has the amino acid arginine rather than histidine at position 270 and is notated as p.R270H) increased the risk of becoming obese. However, this relation was not found in later studies on Danish and European populations. It is possible that the loss of FFAR4 expression or activity may contribute to but by itself is insufficient to promote obesity. Other studies have implicated activated FFAR1 in having anti-obese effects in cultured cells, animal models, and possibly humans (see FFAR1 and obesity). For example, Ffar1 gene knockout mice (i.e., mice made to lack Ffar1 genes) became obese when fed a low-fat diet while control mice became obese only when fed a high-fat diet.

=== Type 2 diabetes ===
The following studies suggest that FFAR4 regulates blood glucose levels and that FFAR4 agonists may be useful for treating individuals with type 2 diabetes. 1) The FFAR4 agonist GSK137647 and docosahexaenoic acid stimulated the release of insulin from cultured mouse and rat pancreatic islets (sites of insulin production and storage) and improved post-feeding hyperglycemia in diabetic mice. 2) The FFAR1 agonist TUG-891 stimulated cultured mouse fat cells to take up glucose and lowered fasting and post-feeding blood glucose levels in diabetic rats; it also stimulated insulin secretion and lowered blood glucose levels in mice. 3) FFAR1 agonist compound A (Merck & Co.) and, with greater efficacy, a dual agonist of FFAR1 and FFAR4, DFL23916, improved blood insulin and glucose levels in mice challenged with a glucose tolerance test. 4) Fatty acid activators of FFAR4 promoted the release of glucagon-like peptide-1 and gastric inhibitory peptide (both stimulate insulin secretion) and reduced secretion of ghrelin (which stimulates the drive to eat) in mice. 5) Downregulation (i.e., forced reduction in the cellular levels) of FFAR4 impaired insulin's actions by reducing the levels of the glucose transporter GLUT4 and insulin receptor substrate in 3T3-L1 mouse fat cells. 6) FFAR4-deficient mice developed glucose intolerance (a potential form of prediabetes) when fed a high fat diet. 7) A diet rich in omega-3 fatty acids improved insulin sensitivity and glucose uptake in muscle and liver tissues in normal but not FFAR4-deficient mice. 8) FFAR4 levels in pancreas islets are higher in individuals with higher insulin and lower HbA1c levels (HbA1c levels rise with higher blood glucose levels averaged over the preceding 3 months). And, 9) individuals who carried the FFAR4 gene variant, p.R270H, (codes a hypoactive FFAR4) who regularly consumed low-fat diets had an increased incidence of developing type 2 diabetes; this association did not occur in p.R270H carriers who regularly consumed high-fat diets.

In a phase II clinical trial (NCT02444910 https://www.clinicaltrials.gov), nine adults with previously untreated insulin-resistant type 2 diabetes were treated orally with increasing doses of KDT501 (an isohumulone derivative that is a relative weak FFAR4 activator and partial agonist of PPARγ) for up to 29 days. After treatment, the participants had significantly lower blood plasma triglyceride and TNF-α levels and higher levels of adiponectin, a regulator of blood glucose levels. However, there were no significant changes in these individuals' oral glucose tolerance test results or measurements of insulin sensitivity. Further studies including the usage of more potent and selectively acting FFAR4 agonists are needed to determine their effectiveness in regulating blood glucose levels and treating type 2 diabetes. Two separate studies have reported that the selective FFAR1 agonists MK‐8666 and TAK-875 greatly improved blood glucose levels in type 2 diabetic patients but also appeared to cause unacceptable liver damage (see FFAR1 and type 2 diabetes). These studies have been regarded as proof that FFAR1 contributes to regulating glucose levels in patients with type 2 diabetes and therefore is a target for treating these patients with FFAR1 agonists that do not have significant adverse effects such as hepatotoxicity. Recent preclinical studies are examining other FFAR1 agonists for their liver and other toxicities.

=== Taste ===
Human and rodent taste buds and other areas of their tongues contain cells that express taste receptors which detect the five taste perception elements viz., saltiness, sourness, bitterness, sweetness, and umami. One well-studied site that has these receptor-bearing cells is in the mouse and human taste buds of their tongues' circumvallate papillae. TUG-891 stimulated cultured mouse and human taste bud cells to mobilize several cell activation pathways. Furthermore: 1) application of TUG-891 to the tongues of mice caused alterations in their blood levels of cholecystokinin (one of its functions is to mediate satiety) and adipokines (i.e., signaling proteins secreted by fat tissues); 2) dietary fatty acids that activate FFAR4 altered the taste of and preferences for fats in rats; 3) FFAR4-deficient mice were less likely to consume fatty meals; 4) the injection of the FFAR4 agonist GPR120 III into the arcuate nucleus and nucleus accumbens brain areas of mice reduced their food intake and suppressed the rewarding effects of high-fat and high-sugar foods; and 5) TUG-891 enhanced humans' fatty orosensation (i.e., false sensation of taste obtained by tongue stimulation) when added to FFAR4-activating dietary fats but not when added to fat-free mineral oil. The latter finding suggests that in humans FFAR4 agonists enhance the sensation of fats but by themselves do not directly evoke it. However, one study found that mice with non-functional Ffra4 genes retained their preferences for oily solutions and long chain fatty acids. Follow-up studies are essential to confirm the functional roles of FFAR4 in taste perceptions and preferences.

=== Inflammation ===
FFAR4 is expressed by a variety of cell types involved in inflammation such as macrophages, dendritic cells, eosinophils, neutrophils, and T cells. FFAR4 activators inhibited: human eosinophils from secreting a pro-inflammatory cytokine, interleukin 4; mouse RAW 264.7 and peritoneal macrophages from secreting the pro-inflammatory cytokines tumor necrosis factor-α (i.e., TNF-α) and interleukin-6; bone marrow-derived mouse dendritic cells from secreting the pro-inflammatory cytokines monocyte chemoattractant protein 1, TNF-α, interleukin 6, interleukin-12 subunit alpha, and interleukin-12 subunit beta; and mouse helper and cytotoxic T cells from releasing the pro-inflammatory cytokines interferon gamma, interleukin 17, interleukin-2, and TNF-α. These findings suggest that FFAR4 acts to suppress inflammation, a view supported by the following studies. FFAR4-deficient mice have increased levels of inflammation in their fat tissues. Furthermore, FFAR4 agonist drugs and/or omega-3 fatty acids reduced: 1) the chronic inflammation that develops in the fat and liver tissues of db/db mice; 2) cyclophosphamide-induced interstitial cystitis (i.e., urinary bladder inflammation) in rats; 3) the liver inflammation which follows transient blockage of its blood supply in mice; 4) chronic sleep deprivation-induced inflammation of visceral fat tissues in mice; 5) diet-induced inflammation in the islets of the pancreas in mice (this reduction did not occur in mice lacking a functional FFAR4 gene); 6) 2,4-dinitrochlorobenzene-induced mouse contact dermatitis (this reduction did not occur in FFAR4 gene-deficient mice); 7) dextran sodium sulfate-induced colitis in mice; and 8) brain inflammation due to the reduction of blood flow to the brains of mice caused by experimentally induced cerebral infarction.

The short-term (i.e., less than 29 days) phase II clinical trial (NCT02444910 https://www.clinicaltrials.gov) found that nine diabetic adults treated with the FFAR4 agonist KDT501 developed higher plasma levels of adiponectin. Biopsied specimens of these individual's subcutaneous fat tissues obtained up to 3 days after the end of KDT501 treatment released greater amounts of adiponectin than biopsies obtained before KDT501 treatment. Adiponectin has various anti-inflammatory actions.

=== Atherosclerosis and cardiovascular disease ===
Arterial atherosclerosis is initiated by damage to these blood vessels' endothelial cells, i.e., their single layers of cells which face the blood. This damage opens a passage for circulating low-density lipoproteins to enter the vessel and move to its innermost layer, the tunica intima, where they are metabolized to oxidized low-density lipoproteins (i.e., oxLDL). Circulating monocytes attach to the damaged endothelium, move to the tunica intima, ingest the oxLDL, and differentiate into M1 macrophages, i.e., macrophages that promote inflammation. These M1 cells continue to ingest oxLDL and may eventually become cholesterol-laden foam cells that promote the development of atheromatous plaques, i.e., hardened accumulations of macrophages, lipids, calcium, and fibrous connective tissue. Over time, the plaques may grow to sizes that narrow or occlude the arteries in which they reside to cause peripheral artery disease, hypertension, coronary artery diseases, and heart damage. The following studies suggest that the suppression of vascular inflammation by FFAR4 agonists reduces the development of atherosclerosis and its associated disorders. 1) The FFAR1/FFAR4 activating drug, GW9508, stimulated cultured human THP-1 macrophage foam cells and RAW264.7 mouse macrophages to secrete their cholesterol and reduce their levels of cholesteryl esters. 2) In cell cultures, GW9508 and TUG-891 inhibited THP-1 monocytes from attaching to human aortic endothelial cells. 3) Long-term administration of GW9508 or TUG-891 to APOE−/− mice (these mice develop atherosclerosis due to lack of the apolipoprotein E gene) converted M1 macrophages to inflammation-suppressing M2-macrophages and resulted in less vascular inflammation and smaller atherosclerotic plaques (TUG-891's actions were reversed by the FFAR4 antagonist, AH-7614). 4) Following constriction of their aortas (using an experimental procedure termed transverse aortic constriction which forces the heart to beat against excessively high blood pressures), the hearts of FFAR4-deficient male but not female mice had pathologically thickened ventricle walls which contracted dysfunctionally compared to mice with normal FFAR4 levels. 5) Cardiac tissue FFAR4 levels were lower in humans with congestive heart failure. And, 6) compared to women, men carrying the defective p.R270H FFAR4 gene had several cardiac abnormalities including larger left ventricle masses, larger left ventricle diameters as measured at the end of diastole, increased maximum left cardiac atrium sizes, and a trend toward somewhat lower minimum cardiac ejection fractions. Many but not all clinical trials have found that dietary regimens enriched with eicosapentaenoic and docosahexaenoic acids lower the risk of coronary artery heart disease, congestive heart failure, and sudden death due to cardiac disease. Further studies are needed to determine if the therapeutic effects of omega-3 fatty acids in mice and humans involve FFAR4 activation and if potent, selectively acting FFAR4 drugs are more effective than omega-3 fatty acids in preventing and/or treating these and the other cited atherosclerosis-associated disorders.

=== Cancer ===
FFAR4 has been detected in various types of cultured human cancer cells and found to promote or inhibit their proliferation, migration, survival, and/or resistance to anti-cancer drugs. The direction of their effects depended on the type of cancer cell and response examined. Studies have reported that: 1) GW9508 (which activates FFAR1 but at higher concentrations also activates FFAR4) stimulated migration of human SW480 and HCT116 colon cancer cells (since neither cell line expressed FFRA1, GW9508 appeared to stimulate this migration by activating FFAR4); 2) GW9508 inhibited the migration and proliferation of human A375 and G361 melanoma cells but was less effective on FFAR4 knockdown A375 cells (i.e. cells that have been forced to express low levels of FFAR4; this result suggests that GW5098 acted through both FFAR4 and FFAR1 in these two melanoma cell types); 3) GW9508 stimulated the migration and invasiveness of human MG-63 bone osteosarcoma cells but this stimulation did not occur in FFAR4 gene knockdown cells and therefore appeared to involve FFAR4 activation; 4) the FFAR4 agonist TUG-891 reduced the ability of docosahexaenoic and eicosapentaenoic acids to stimulate the proliferation of human DU145 and PC-3 prostate cancer cells (this result suggests that activated FFAR1 inhibited these cells proliferation); and 5) the effects of FFAR4 and FFAR1 gene knockdowns and TUG-891 treatment in PANC-1 human pancreas cancer cells suggested that FFAR4 stimulated and FFAR1 inhibited these cells motility, invasiveness, and formation of colonies in cell culture assays. Activated FFAR1 also stimulates or inhibits the malignant behaviors of various cancer includend some of those discussed here (see FFAR1 and cancer). Finally, one study reported that individuals carrying a single-nucleotide polymorphism, i.e. SNP, variant allele of the FFAR4 gene (variant described as 9469C>A in which adenine replaces cytosine at position 9469 of the gene's nucleic acid sequence) had increased family histories and personal risks of developing lung cancer. Further animal model, clinical, and gene studies are needed to define the roles of FFAR4 and FFAR1 in these and other cancers.

==== Breast cancer ====
Breast cancer studies on FFAR4 have been more extensive than those on other cancers. Cell culture studies showed that the knockdown of FFAR4 levels in cultured human MCF-7, MDA-MB-231, and SKBR3 breast cancer cells slowed their proliferation and increased their death by apoptosis and that GW9508 and TUG-891 inhibited the proliferation and migration of MCF-7 and MDA-MB-231 cells. Animal studies found that Ffar4 gene knockdown MBA-MB-231 cells transplanted into mice formed more rapidly growing and larger tumors than those formed by normal MBA-MB-231 cell transplants; and that GW9508-treated mice transplanted with FFAR4 gene knockdown MBA-MB-231 cells had more lung metastases than mice transplanted with normal MBA-MB-231-cells. These findings suggest that FFAR4 and FFAR1 contribute to inhibiting breast tumor growth but FFAR1, not FFAR4, inhibits these cell's metastasis. Clinical observation studies reported that: 1) FFAR4 was expressed in patients' breast cancers but not in the normal epithelium lining their breasts' ducts and lobules; 2) the proportions of five fatty acids which activate FFRA4 and FFAR1 (viz., stearic, dihomo-gamma-linolenic, docosatetraenoic, docosapentaenoic, and docosahexaenoic acids) were higher in patients' cancerous than adjacent normal breast tissues; 3) patients with ER(+) breast cancer, (i.e., breast cancers containing cells that express estrogen receptors) had higher cancer tissue levels of FFAR4 than patients with estrogen receptor negative, i.e., ER(-), breast cancer; 4) among all ER(+) breast cancer patients who were treated with tamoxifen (a selective estrogen receptor modulator commonly used to treat breast cancer), those with high cancer cell FFAR4 levels had a significantly lower 10 year recurrence-free survival rate (percentage of individuals disease-free 10 years after diagnosis) and lower 10 year breast cancer-specific survival rate (percentage of individuals alive 10 years after diagnosis) than those with lower FFAR4 expression levels or ER(-) breast cancer patients; 5) individuals with higher cancer tissue FFAR4 levels who had a luminal A, luminal B HER2(–), or luminal B HER(2+) breast cancer subtype (see breast cancer subtypes) had worse prognoses than individuals with low FFAR4 levels in these respective cancer subtypes (individuals with non-luminal HER2(+) or triple-negative breast cancer subtypes did not show this relationship). These clinical findings allow that one or more of the five FFAR4/FFAR1-activating fatty acids in breast cancer tissues contributes to this cancers development and/or progression; that high levels of FFAR4 in ER(+) breast cancers confer resistance to tamoxifen therapy and thereby reduce survival; and that high levels of FFAR4 are associated with poorer survival in certain breast cancer subtypes. Studies are needed to determine if a high FFAR4 level can be a clinically useful marker for predicting the severity and prognosis of breast cancers, a contraindication to using tamoxifen to treat breast cancers, and a target for treating ER(+) breast cancers with, e.g., a FFAR4 inhibitor.

=== Bone remodeling ===
Osteoclasts absorb bone tissue in a physiological process needed to maintain, repair, and remodel bones. Osteoclasts develop by a process of cellular differentiation termed osteoclastogenesis from cells in the mononuclear phagocyte system. In a mouse bone marrow culture model of bone reabsorption, GW9508 inhibited osteoclast activity by reducing the differentiation of cells to osteoclasts as well as the survival and function of the osteoclasts. Since FFAR4 expression was 100-fold higher than FFAR1 in the osteoclasts and knockdown of FFAR4 in the osteoclasts blocked GW9508's effects, studies suggest that activated FFAR4 functions to block osteoclast-mediated bone resorption. In support of this view, Ffar4 gene knockdown mice developed osteoarthritis more rapidly than control mice in a model of knee osteoarthritis; docosahexaenoic acid inhibited the expression of inflammatory factors in cultured human chondrocytes; and the levels of FFAR4 protein in the osteoarthritic and/or nearby fat tissue of humans with osteoarthritis were higher than those with non-osteoarthritic bone disease. These studies suggest that FFAR4 inhibits bone resorption and may prove to be useful for treating excessive bone resorption, i.e., osteoporosis.

== Ligands ==
Agonists

- DFL23916 (Mixed agonist of FFAR1 and FFAR4, similar potency at both receptors)
- GPR120 compound A
- GSK137647A
- GW9508 (Mixed agonist of FFAR1 and FFAR4 with 60x selectivity for FFAR1)
- TUG-891
- TUG1197

Antagonists

- AH-7614 (described either as antagonist or negative allosteric modulator)

== See also ==
- Free fatty acid receptor
- Free fatty acid receptor 1
