= GSK137647A =

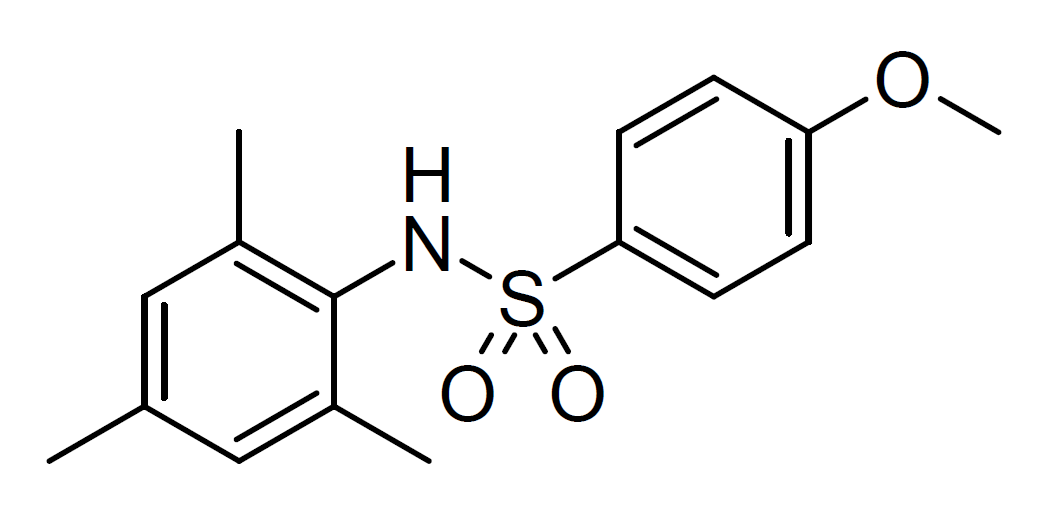

Identifiers
- IUPAC name: 4-methoxy-N-(2,4,6-trimethylphenyl)benzenesulfonamide
- CAS Number: 349085-82-1
- PubChem CID: 743974
- ChemSpider: 650481
- ChEMBL: ChEMBL3311308

Chemical and physical data
- Formula: C_{16}H_{19}NO_{3}S
- Molar mass: 305.39 g·mol^{−1}
- 3D model (JSmol): Interactive image
- SMILES: CC1=CC(=C(C(=C1)C)NS(=O)(=O)C2=CC=C(C=C2)OC)C
- InChI: InChI=1S/C16H19NO3S/c1-11-9-12(2)16(13(3)10-11)17-21(18,19)15-7-5-14(20-4)6-8-15/h5-10,17H,1-4H3; Key:FQUAFMNPXPXOJE-UHFFFAOYSA-N

GSK137647A (also called GSK137647) is an experimental drug which acts as a highly selective and moderately potent agonist for the free fatty acid receptor FFAR4 (GPR120). It has antiinflammatory effects and has been used to research the role of FFAR4 in various processes such as diabetes, ulcerative colitis, maintenance of bone density, and cancer.
