= ZLY18 =

Chemical compound

Legal status
- Legal status: Investigational

Identifiers
- IUPAC name: 2-[2-Fluoro-4-[[3-methoxy-5-[(1E)-2-(4-methoxyphenyl)ethenyl]phenoxy]methyl]phenoxy]acetic acid
- CAS Number: 2642392-33-2

Chemical and physical data
- Formula: C_{25}H_{23}FO_{6}
- Molar mass: 438.451 g·mol^{−1}
- 3D model (JSmol): Interactive image
- SMILES: COc1ccc(cc1)C=Cc2cc(OC)cc(c2)OCc3ccc(c(F)c3)OCC(=O)O
- InChI: InChI=1S/C25H23FO6/c1-29-20-8-5-17(6-9-20)3-4-18-11-21(30-2)14-22(12-18)31-15-19-7-10-24(23(26)13-19)32-16-25(27)28/h3-14H,15-16H2,1-2H3,(H,27,28)/b4-3+; Key:QASIQJGISCBDLW-ONEGZZNKSA-N

ZLY18 is an experimental drug that acts as an agonist of the free fatty acid receptor 1 (FFA1) and all three types of peroxisome proliferator-activated receptor (alpha, delta, and gamma). It is in development for the treatment of non-alcoholic fatty liver disease.
