= GLPG1205 =

Clinical data
- Other names: GLPG-1205
- Drug class: GPR84 antagonist
- ATC code: None

Identifiers
- IUPAC name: 9-(2-cyclopropylethynyl)-2-[[(2S)-1,4-dioxan-2-yl]methoxy]-6,7-dihydropyrimido[6,1-a]isoquinolin-4-one
- CAS Number: 1445847-37-9
- PubChem CID: 71616860
- IUPHAR/BPS: 10171
- DrugBank: DB15346
- ChemSpider: 58906524
- UNII: K9WR6LRA5D
- ChEMBL: ChEMBL3716365

Chemical and physical data
- Formula: C_{22}H_{22}N_{2}O_{3}
- Molar mass: 362.429 g·mol^{−1}
- 3D model (JSmol): Interactive image
- SMILES: C1CC1C#CC2=CC3=C(C=C2)C4=CC(=NC(=O)N4CC3)OC[C@@H]5COCCO5
- InChI: InChI=1S/C22H22N2O4/c25-22-23-21(28-14-18-13-26-9-10-27-18)12-20-19-6-5-16(4-3-15-1-2-15)11-17(19)7-8-24(20)22/h5-6,11-12,15,18H,1-2,7-10,13-14H2/t18-/m0/s1; Key:IRBAWVGZNJIROV-SFHVURJKSA-N

GLPG1205 is an experimental drug which acts as a selective antagonist (or perhaps negative allosteric modulator) at the free fatty acid receptor GPR84. It has antiinflammatory and anti-fibrotic effects and reached Phase II human clinical trials for treatment of both ulcerative colitis and idiopathic pulmonary fibrosis, although development for both indications was ultimately dropped due to poor efficacy. However, it continues to be researched for potential applications in the treatment of other conditions such as asthma and acute immune-mediated liver injury.
