= GPR42 =

Protein-coding gene in the species Homo sapiens

Identifiers
- Aliases: GPR42, FFAR1L, FFAR3L, GPR41L, GPR42P, G protein-coupled receptor 42 (gene/pseudogene), G protein-coupled receptor 42
- External IDs: OMIM: 603822; MGI: 2685324; GeneCards: GPR42

Gene location (Human)
Chr.	Chromosome 19 (human)
Band	19q13.12	Start	35,371,068 bp
Band	19q13.12	End	35,372,962 bp

Gene location (Mouse)
Chr.	Chromosome 7 (mouse)
Band	7|7 B1	Start	30,553,755 bp
Band	7|7 B1	End	30,555,603 bp
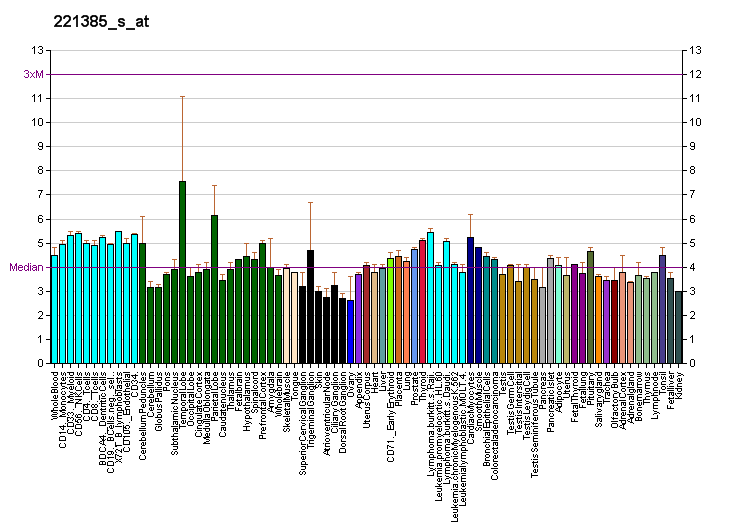
RNA expression pattern
Bgee	Human / Mouse (ortholog); Top expressed in: blood; muscle layer of sigmoid colon; muscle of thigh; islet of Langerhans; appendix; subcutaneous adipose tissue; urinary bladder; lactiferous gland; gallbladder; muscle tissue / Top expressed in: islet of Langerhans; embryo; blastocyst; nerve trunk; proximal tubule; autonomic nervous system; right kidney; sympathetic nervous system; sympathetic ganglion; duodenum; More reference expression data
BioGPS	More reference expression data
Gene ontology
Molecular function	G protein-coupled receptor activity; signal transducer activity
Cellular component	integral component of membrane; plasma membrane; integral component of plasma membrane; membrane
Biological process	G protein-coupled receptor signaling pathway; signal transduction
Sources:Amigo / QuickGO
Orthologs
Databases	NCBI: entry; OMA: entry
Species	Human	Mouse
Entrez	2866	233080
Ensembl	ENSG00000126251	ENSMUSG00000019429
UniProt	O15529	Q3UFD7
RefSeq (mRNA)	NM_005305; NM_001348195	NM_001033316
RefSeq (protein)	NP_001335124	NP_001028488
Location (UCSC)	Chr 19: 35.37 – 35.37 Mb	Chr 7: 30.55 – 30.56 Mb
PubMed search
- Wikidata
View/Edit Human	View/Edit Mouse

Putative G-protein coupled receptor 42 (previously termed FFAR1L, FFAR3L, GPR41L, and GPR42P) is a protein that in humans is encoded by the GPR42 gene. The human GPR gene is located at the same site as the human FFAR1, FFAR, and FFAR3 genes, i.e., on the long (i.e., "q") arm of chromosome 19 at position 23.33 (notated as 19q23.33). This gene appears to be a segmental duplication of the FFAR3 gene. The human GPR42 gene codes for several proteins with a FFAR3-like structure but their expression in various cell types and tissues as well as their activities and functions have not yet been clearly defined in any scientific publication followed by PubMed as of 2023.

== See also ==
- Free fatty acid receptors
- Free fatty acid receptor 3
