= Fezagepras =

Clinical data
- Other names: Setogepram; PBI-4050; PBI4050
- Drug class: FFAR1 (GPR40) agonist; GPR84 antagonist

Identifiers
- IUPAC name: 2-(3-pentylphenyl)acetic acid
- CAS Number: 1002101-19-0
- PubChem CID: 24749700
- IUPHAR/BPS: 10043
- DrugBank: DB15447
- ChemSpider: 58107628
- UNII: 879OVM0Y1S
- ChEMBL: ChEMBL4297635

Chemical and physical data
- Formula: C_{13}H_{18}O_{2}
- Molar mass: 206.285 g·mol^{−1}
- 3D model (JSmol): Interactive image
- SMILES: CCCCCC1=CC(=CC=C1)CC(=O)O
- InChI: InChI=1S/C13H18O2/c1-2-3-4-6-11-7-5-8-12(9-11)10-13(14)15/h5,7-9H,2-4,6,10H2,1H3,(H,14,15); Key:PEGQOIGYZLJMIB-UHFFFAOYSA-N

Fezagepras (developmental code name PBI-4050), also known previously as setogepram, is an experimental drug which acts as a mixed agonist-antagonist for certain free fatty acid receptors, being an agonist at FFAR1 (GPR40) but an antagonist at GPR84. It has antiinflammatory and anti-fibrotic effects and has reached Phase II human clinical trials for treatment of idiopathic pulmonary fibrosis. However, development was discontinued for all indications in 2022.

Medium-chain fatty acids are known to act as GPR84 agonists and have been found to produce inflammation and mediate aging-associated cognitive decline via this action. Fezagepras has been found to block 3-hydroxyoctanoic acid (3-HOA)-mediated neuronal inhibition in the hippocampus and associated cognitive impairment in rodents. Similarly, it blocked the detrimental effects of the medium-chain fatty acid-producing gut bacteria Parabacteroides goldsteinii on memory in rodents. In addition, fezagepras restored youthful memory function in aged rodents.
