= GPR84 =

Protein-coding gene in the species Homo sapiens

Identifiers
- Aliases: GPR84, EX33, GPCR4, G protein-coupled receptor 84
- External IDs: OMIM: 606383; MGI: 1934129; GeneCards: GPR84

Gene location (Human)
Chr.	Chromosome 12 (human)
Band	12q13.13	Start	54,362,445 bp
Band	12q13.13	End	54,364,487 bp

Gene location (Mouse)
Chr.	Chromosome 15 (mouse)
Band	15|15 F3	Start	103,216,662 bp
Band	15|15 F3	End	103,219,039 bp
RNA expression pattern
Bgee	Human / Mouse (ortholog); Top expressed in: bone marrow; testicle; bone marrow cell; trabecular bone; monocyte; blood; appendix; granulocyte; amniotic fluid; spleen / Top expressed in: granulocyte; neural layer of retina; tibiofemoral joint; bone marrow; stroma of bone marrow; vasculature of organ; secondary oocyte; superior frontal gyrus; hippocampus proper; cerebellar cortex; More reference expression data
BioGPS	n/a
Gene ontology
Molecular function	G protein-coupled receptor activity; signal transducer activity; galanin receptor activity; urotensin II receptor activity; G protein-coupled peptide receptor activity
Cellular component	integral component of membrane; plasma membrane; receptor complex; integral component of plasma membrane; membrane; specific granule membrane; tertiary granule membrane
Biological process	phospholipase C-activating G protein-coupled receptor signaling pathway; signal transduction; neutrophil degranulation; adenylate cyclase-modulating G protein-coupled receptor signaling pathway; neuropeptide signaling pathway; G protein-coupled receptor signaling pathway; biological process
Sources:Amigo / QuickGO
Orthologs
Databases	NCBI: entry; OMA: entry
Species	Human	Mouse
Entrez	53831	80910
Ensembl	ENSG00000139572	ENSMUSG00000063234
UniProt	Q9NQS5	Q8CIM5
RefSeq (mRNA)	NM_020370	NM_030720
RefSeq (protein)	NP_065103	NP_109645
Location (UCSC)	Chr 12: 54.36 – 54.36 Mb	Chr 15: 103.22 – 103.22 Mb
PubMed search
- Wikidata
View/Edit Human	View/Edit Mouse

Probable G-protein coupled receptor 84 is a protein that in humans is encoded by the GPR84 gene.

== Discovery ==
GPR84 (EX33) was described practically in the same time by two groups. One was the group of Timo Wittenberger in the Zentrum fur Molekulare Neurobiologie, Hamburg, Germany (Wittenberg T. et al.) and the other was the group of Gabor Jarai in Novartis Horsham Research Centre, Horsham, United Kingdom. In their papers they described the sequence and expression profile of five new members of GPC receptor family. One among them was GPR84 which represents a unique GPCR sub-family so far.

== Gene ==
Hgpr84 locates to chromosome 12q13.13, and its coding sequence is not interrupted by introns.

== Protein ==
The human and the murine GPR84 ORFs both encode proteins of 396 amino acid residues length with 85% identity and are therefore considered as orthologs. The hgpr84 was found by Northern blot analysis as a transcript of about 1.5 kb in brain, heart, muscle, colon, thymus, spleen, kidney, liver, intestine, placenta, lung, and leukocytes. In addition, a 1.2 kb transcript in heart and a strong band at 1.3 kb in muscle were detected. A Northern blot from different brain regions revealed strongest expression of the 1.5 kb transcript in the medulla and the spinal cord. Somewhat less transcript was found in the substantia nigra, thalamus, and the corpus callosum. The 1.5 kb band was also visible in other brain regions, but at very low levels. EST clones corresponding to hgpr84 were from B cells (leukemia), neuroendocrine lung as well as in microglial cells and adipocytes. A more detailed description of expression profile can be found in www.genecards.org. The resting expression of GPR84 is usually low but it is highly inducible in inflammation. Its expression on neutrophils can be increased with LPS stimulation and reduced with GM-CSF stimulation. The LPS-induced upregulation of GPR84 was not sensitive to dexamethasone pretreatment. There was also a GPR84 downregulation in dendritic cell derived from FcRgamma chain KO mice. In microglial cells, the GPR84 induction with interleukin-1 (IL-1) and tumor necrosis factor α (TNFα) was also demonstrated. 24 h treatment with IL-1β also induced 5.8 times increase in GPR84 expression on PBMC from healthy individuals. . Transcriptional dynamics of human umbilical cord blood T helper cells cultured in absence and presence of cytokines promoting Th1 or Th2 differentiation was studies. It turned out that GPR84 belongs to the Th1 specific subset genes. While another publication suggests that GPR84 is rather a CCL1 related Th2 type gene.

GPR84 was also upregulated on both macrophages and neutrophyl granulocytes after LPS stimulation. Not only LPS challenge but Staphylococcus enterotoxin B was sufficient to cause a 50 times increase in GPR84 expression on isolated human leukocytes stimulated with compared to the expression of naive leukocytes. A viral infection following Japanese encephalitis virus infection also increased GPR84 expression by 2–4.5% in the mice brain.

Ablating lysosomal acid lipase (Lal-/-) in mice led to aberrant expansion of myeloid-derived suppressive cells (MDSCs) (>40% in the blood, and >70% in the bone marrow) that arise from dysregulated production of myeloid progenitor cells in the bone marrow. Ly6G + MDSCs in Lal-/- mice show strong immunosuppression on T cells, which contributes to impaired T cell proliferation and function in vivo. GPR84 was 9.1 fold upregulated in the MDSCs of Lal-/- mice. GPR84 is normally expressed at low levels in myeloid cells and can be induced in vitro by stimulating macrophage or microglial cells with LPS, TNFα, or PMA. Elevated expression of GPR84 was also observed during the demyelination phase of the reversible Cuprizone-Induced Demyelinating Disease mouse model. Finally, it has also shown that GPR84 expression is increased in both the normal appearing white matter and plaque in brains from human Multiple Sclerosis patients. Expression of GPR84 increases in mouse whole brain samples from experimental autoimmune encephalomyelitis before the onset of clinical disease. In cultured microglia in response to simulated blast overpressure the expression of GPR84 was increased 2.9 fold. In ageing TgSwe mice were subjected to traumatic brain injury GPR84 was upregulated by 6.3 fold. GPR84 expression was increased by 49.9 times in M1 type macrophages isolated from aortic atherosclerotic lesions of LDLR-/- mice were fed a western diet. GPR84 is important in regulating the expression of cytokines: CD4+ T cells from GPR84-/- mice show increase IL-4 secretion in the presence of anti-CD3 and anti-CD28 antibodies; GPR84 potentiates LPS-induced IL12p40 secretion in RAW264.7 cells. Recent work by Nagasaki et al. explored 3T3-L1 adipocytes cocultured with RAW264.7 cells to examine this potential interaction. RAW264.7 coculture increases GPR84 expression in 3T3-L1 adipocytes, and incubation with capric acid can inhibit TNFα-induced adiponectin release. Adiponectin regulates many metabolic processes associated with glucose and fatty acids, including insulin sensitivity and lipid breakdown. Furthermore, a high-fat diet can increase GPR84 expression. The authors suggest that GPR84 may explain the relationship between diabetes and obesity. As adipocytes release fatty acids in the presence of macrophages, the loop of increased GPR84 expression and its stimulation prevent the release of regulating hormones. The work on GPR84 is still very early and needs to be expanded in the context of pathophysiology and immune regulation. Some people presume the role of GPR84 in food intake too. GPR84 is expressed in the gastric corpus mucosa and this receptor can be an important luminal sensors of food intake and are most likely expressed on entero-endocrine cells, where it stimulates the release of peptide hormones including incretins glucagon-like peptide (GLP) 1 and 2.

== Ligands ==
=== Agonists ===
The ligands for GPR84 suggest also a relationship between inflammation and fatty acid sensing or regulation. Medium-chain free fatty acids (FFA) with carbon chain lengths of C9 to C14. Capric acid (C10:0), undecanoic acid (C11:0), and lauric acid (C12:0) are the most potent described endogenous agonists of GPR84. Not activated by short-chain and long-chain saturated and unsaturated FFAs induced in monocytes or macrophages by lipopolysaccharide (LPS). In addition, the activation of GPR84 in monocytes/macrophages amplifies LPS stimulated interleukin-12 (IL-12) p40 production in a concentration-dependent manner. IL-12 plays an important role in promoting cell-mediated immunity to eradicate pathogens by inducing and maintaining T helper 1 responses and inhibiting T helper 2 responses. Medium-chain FFAs inhibited forskolin-induced cAMP production and stimulated [35S]GTPgammaS binding in a GPR84-dependent manner. The EC_{50} values for medium-chain FFAs capric acid, undecanoic acid, and lauric acid at GPR84 (4, 8, and 9 mM, respectively, in the cAMP assay). These results suggest that GPR84 activation by medium-chain FFAs is coupled to a pertussis toxin-sensitive Gi/o pathway. Besides medium-chain FFAs, diindolylmethane was also described as GPR84 agonist. However, the target selectivity of this molecule is also questionable because diindolylmethane is an aryl hydrocarbon receptor modulator, too. The patent literature mentions that besides medium-chain FFAs other substances as embelin (2,5-dihydroxy-3-undecyl(1,4)benzoquinone), icosa-5,8,11,14-tetraynoic acid, and 5S,6R-dihydroxy-icosa-7,9,11,14-tetraenoic acid (5S,6RdiHETE) are also ligands of GPR84. These two latest molecules say against the statement that long-chain FFAs are not ligands of GPR84. Based on these results it is probable that besides medium-chain FFAs some long chain FFAs can also be endogenous ligands of GPR84. Further work is needed to confirm this hypothesis.

=== Antagonists ===
The molecule GLPG1205, a selective GPR84 antagonist, was under investigation by the Belgian firm Galapagos NV. Its clinical effect against inflammatory disorders like inflammatory bowel disease was being investigated in 2015 in a Phase 2 Proof-of-Concept study in ulcerative colitis patients. The results published in January 2016 showed good pharmacokinetics, safety and tolerability. However, the target efficacy was not met. The development of GLPG1205 for ulcerative colitis was therefore stopped.

Fezagepras (setogepram; PBI-4050), which is a FFAR1 (GPR40) agonist and GPR84 antagonist, was under investigation by the Canadian biotechnology firm Prometic for the treatment of fibrosis, but was discontinued in 2022.

LMNL-6511 is a selective GPR84 antagonist which is in phase 1/2 clinical trials for treatment of fibrosis.

=== Classification of GPR84 ===
Based on its binding and activation by medium-chain fatty acids, GPR84 has been recognized as a possible member of the free fatty acid receptor family. However, GPR84 has not yet been given a FFAR designation possibly because capric acid, the most potent medium-chain fatty acid in activating GPR44, requires high concentrations (e.g., in the micromolar range) to do so. This consideration supports the need to search for other naturally occurring agents that are more potent than caproic acid in activating this receptor. In the meantime, GPR84 continues to be defined as an orphan receptor, i.e., a receptor whose naturally occurring activator(s) is unclear.

== Major mediator in pathologic fibrotic pathways ==
GPR84 has been proposed to be a major mediator in pathologic fibrotic pathways.
