= GW9508 =

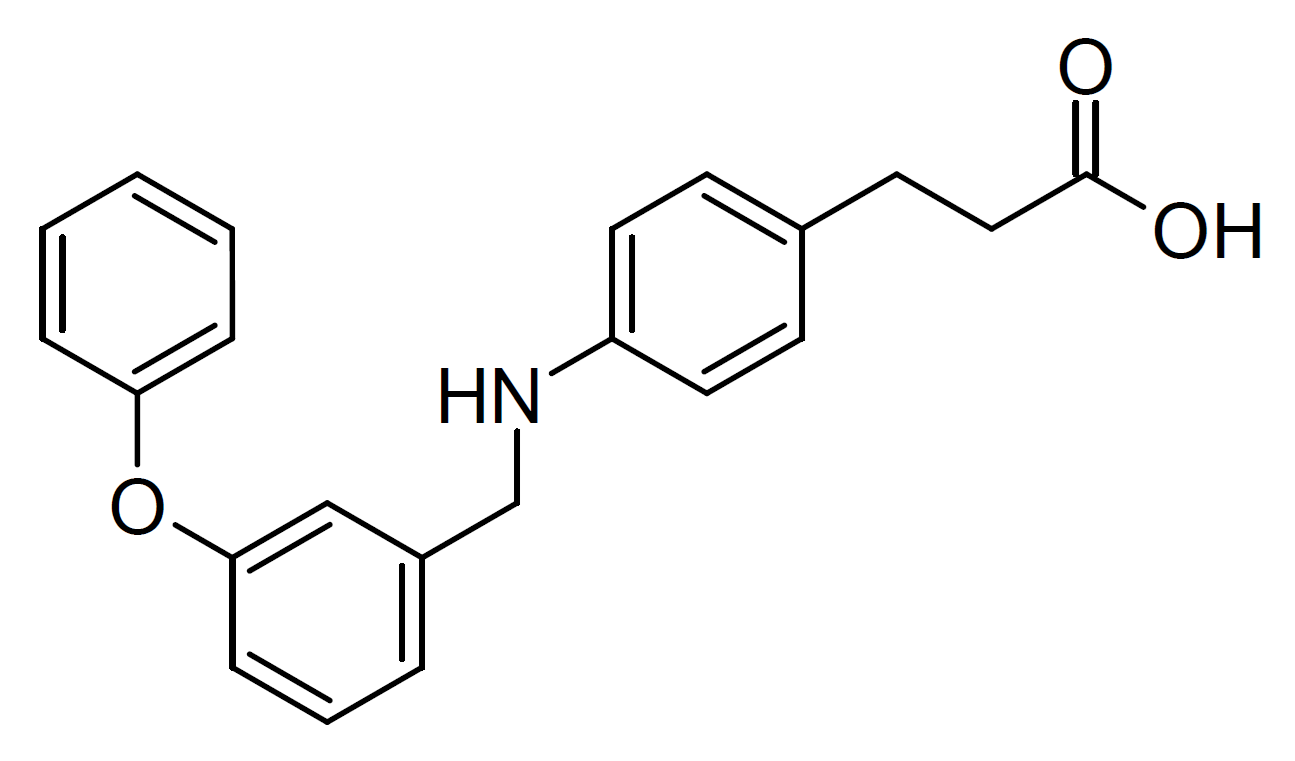

Identifiers
- IUPAC name: 3-[4-[(3-phenoxyphenyl)methylamino]phenyl]propanoic acid
- CAS Number: 885101-89-3
- PubChem CID: 11595431
- IUPHAR/BPS: 1050
- ChemSpider: 9770191
- UNII: 4T77GYP2CS
- ChEBI: CHEBI:93259
- ChEMBL: ChEMBL207881
- CompTox Dashboard (EPA): DTXSID70237088
- ECHA InfoCard: 100.161.077

Chemical and physical data
- Formula: C_{22}H_{21}NO_{3}
- Molar mass: 347.414 g·mol^{−1}
- 3D model (JSmol): Interactive image
- SMILES: C1=CC=C(C=C1)OC2=CC=CC(=C2)CNC3=CC=C(C=C3)CCC(=O)O
- InChI: InChI=1S/C22H21NO3/c24-22(25)14-11-17-9-12-19(13-10-17)23-16-18-5-4-8-21(15-18)26-20-6-2-1-3-7-20/h1-10,12-13,15,23H,11,14,16H2,(H,24,25); Key:DGENZVKCTGIDRZ-UHFFFAOYSA-N

GW9508 is an experimental drug which acts as a mixed agonist for the free fatty acid receptors FFAR1 (GPR40) and FFAR4 (GPR120). It is around 60x more potent as an agonist at FFAR1, but has nevertheless often been used as a model agonist for FFAR4 especially in tissues which lack FFAR1 or in the presence of FFAR1 antagonists, due to a historical lack of availability of highly selective FFAR4 agonists. It has antiinflammatory effects and has also been used to study the role of FFAR1 and FFAR4 in various processes such as regulation of insulin and ghrelin release, immune system function, and maintenance of bone density.
