= EktaH =

Pharmaceutical company in Dijon, France

- Company type: Joint-stock company
- Industry: Pharmaceutical
- Founded: 2021; 4 years ago
- Founders: Naim Khan, Xavier Boidevezi, Amira Sayed Khan, Aziz Hichami
- Headquarters: Dijon, France
- Key people: Xavier Boidevezi (CEO)
- Products: Orodispersible tablets for obesity treatment
- Website: www.ektah.com

EktaH is a French pharmaceutical company based in Dijon, France, that develops therapeutic solutions to reduce obesity. The company specializes in the development of fat taste receptor agonists. These agonists are formulated as orodispersible tablets that aim to reactivate fat taste receptors before food intake to help induce early satiety and reduce food intake.

== History ==
EktaH was established in July 2021 by Naim Akhtar Khan, a professor of nutritional physiology at the University of Burgundy, and his colleagues Xavier Boidevezi, Amira Sayed Khan, and Aziz Hichami. The formation of EktaH followed 15 years of academic research intended to commercialize research findings related to fat taste receptor activation, a method initially validated in animal models.

After its inception, EktaH increased its capital with funding from SATT Sayens and other investors to begin its first clinical phase by the end of 2021. The company received multiple recognitions in 2022: it won the i-LAB innovation competition in July, was acknowledged by the European Institute of Innovation and Technology in September, and was named one of the winners of the “France 2030” call for projects in October. These achievements supported the initiation of the first human safety study of its patented molecules by the end of the year.

In the following years, 2023 and 2024, EktaH completed repeated toxicity studies in rats, which set the stage for subsequent trials involving repeated doses in obese patients.
