= EInstruction =

American educational technology company

eInstruction
- Company type: Private
- Industry: Education Technology
- Founded: 1981
- Fate: Acquired by Turning Technologies
- Headquarters: Scottsdale, Arizona, USA
- Area served: Worldwide
- Products: Classroom Performance System
- Services: Education Technology, Technical Support, Professional Development, Training
- Website: einstruction.com

eInstruction was an American educational technology company founded in 1981.

== History ==
eInstruction was founded in 1981 by computer science professor Darrell Ward. In the 1990s, eInstruction sold a radio frequency (RF) response system manufactured by Fleetwood.

In 2000, Ward and his team developed student response systems in education, with the creation of a hand-held "clicker" system called CPS (Classroom Performance System). In addition to CPS and other interactive classroom technologies, Einstruction worked with educators providing professional development and training.

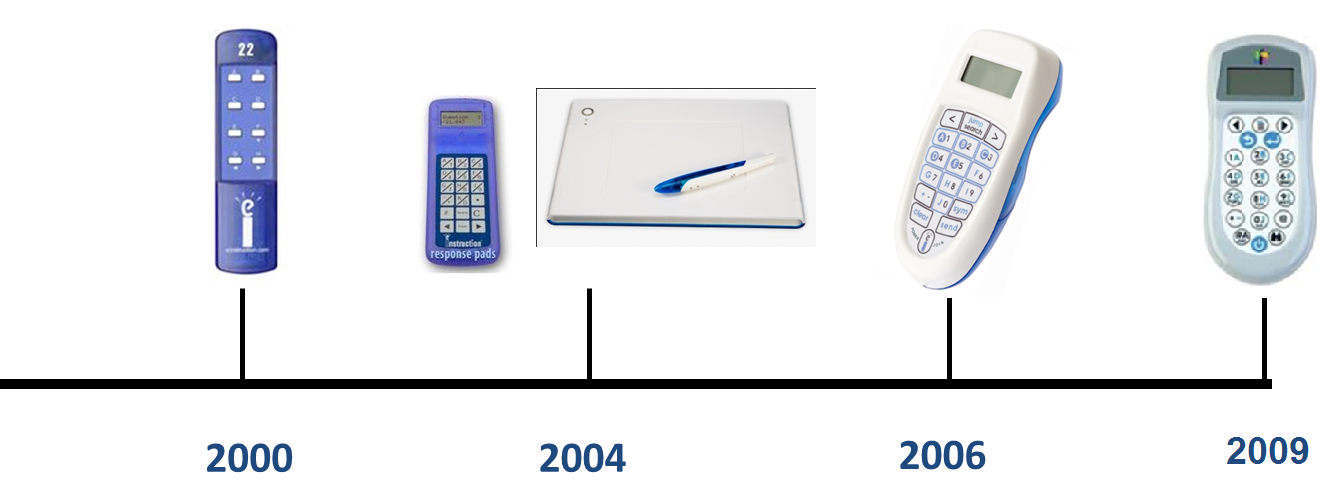
eInstruction Timeline

In 2006, eInstruction acquired FS Creations, which developed the Examview test bank.

eInstruction acquired Interwrite Learning in 2008, which included GTCO CalComp. GTCO produced tablets with wireless and Bluetooth connectivity.

In 2009, eInstruction released a mobile interactive whiteboard tablet, as well a system which allowed multiple students to use the same board simultaneously.

eInstruction also created the online resource community eI Community, the enterprise-based administrator tool eI Cornerstone Education Suite, and the Insight 360 Formative Instruction System.

Einstruction was purchased by Turning Technologies in 2013.
