= Turning Technologies =

Education technology company

Turning Technologies, Inc.
- Company type: Privately held company
- Founded: 2002; 24 years ago in Youngstown, Ohio, United States
- Headquarters: Youngstown, Ohio
- Key people: Murad Velani (CEO); Jim Gilbertson (CFO); Kathryn Stewart (CTO, CPO); Jeff Peterson (CMO, CXO)
- Website: www.turningtechnologies.com

Turning Technologies was an education technology company with a headquarters in Youngstown, Ohio, and additional offices in Scottsdale, Arizona, and Belfast. Turning Technologies served educational, corporate, government and military markets.

== History ==
Turning Technologies was founded by former CEO Mike Broderick in 2002 as a member of the Youngstown Business Incubator. Starting with just three employees, the company soon expanded and, in 2007, was ranked among the seven fastest-growing small businesses in the nation by Entrepreneur magazine, and was named the fastest growing privately held software company in the U.S. by Inc. Magazine. In 2008, the company moved from the business incubator to the Taft Technology Center in order to accommodate an increase in employees.

In 2013, Turning Technologies acquired eInstruction, one of its biggest competitors in the education technology market. As part of the eInstruction purchase, Turning Technologies also acquired GTCO CalComp.

When Broderick retired in 2016, then-Chief Operating Officer and Chief Technology Officer Ethan Cohen took over as CEO. The next CEO, Kenneth Frank, stepped into the position in June 2019 and served until his resignation in June 2021.

On January 11, 2022, it was announced that Turning has merged with Echo360. Murad Velani remained the CEO of the new merged company, Echo360. The Turning websites now redirect to the Echo360 webpages.

== Company ==
The company was headed by Chief Executive Officer Kenneth Frank until June 2, 2021, when he resigned. Although Turning Technologies sold hardware products, including whiteboards and clickers, it operated primarily on a software-as-a-service (SaaS) model.

== Products ==
Turning Technologies offered software including TurningPoint audience response system and ExamView; response options including hardware clickers and a mobile app; and interactive whiteboards. On June 30, 2024, ExamView will officially reach its end-of-life. Echo360 no longer provides updates and they suggest migrating to their new product EchoExam. It was also noted that ExamView will no longer be bundled with publishers.
