= Bone marrow-derived macrophage =

Bone-marrow-derived macrophage (BMDM) refers to macrophage cells that are generated in a research laboratory from mammalian bone marrow cells. BMDMs can differentiate into mature macrophages in the presence of growth factors and other signaling molecules. Undifferentiated bone marrow cells are cultured in the presence of macrophage colony-stimulating factor (M-CSF; CSF-1). M-CSF is a cytokine and growth factor that is responsible for the proliferation and commitment of myeloid progenitors into monocytes (which then mature into macrophages). Macrophages have a wide variety of functions in the body including phagocytosis of foreign invaders and other cellular debris, releasing cytokines to trigger immune responses, and antigen presentation. BMDMs provide a large homogenous population of macrophages that play an increasingly important role in making macrophage-related research possible and financially feasible.

== Production ==
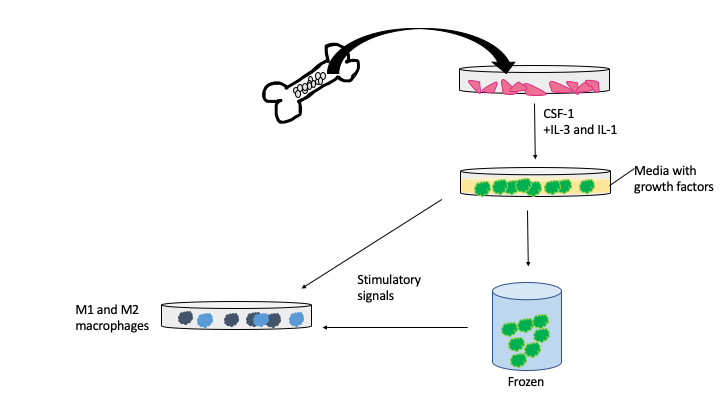
Schema of in vitro BMDM production

In order to produce BMDMs, hematopoietic stem cells are removed from the tibia or femur of mice. Since BMDMs are derived from bone marrow, withdrawn cells are healthy and naïve (or unactivated), regardless of the condition of donor mice. After removal, stem-cells are incubated with CSF-1. Without CSF-1, the cells enter an inactive state but can reinitiate growth and differentiation if stimulated later. Mature macrophages and fibroblasts, which may carry unwanted growth factors, are removed. Next, IL-3 and IL-1, two growth factors, are often added to increase yield and promote rapid terminal differentiation. Exogenous media containing growth factors and other serums must also be added to make the cells continually viable. Full growth and differentiation take approximately 5–8 days.

Millions of BMDMs can be derived from one mouse and frozen for years. After being thawed BMDMs can respond to a variety of stimuli such as LPS, IFN-γ, PAMPs, NF-κB, and IRF3. These signals induce translation of genes that produce cytokines and determine if macrophages are M1 (pro-inflammatory) or M2 (anti-inflammatory). If BMDMs are not frozen, they age and become less viable as CSF-1 and growth factors in their media decreases.

Proliferation of BMDMs can also be inhibited by a number of reagents. For example, growth and differentiation is dependent on CSF-1 and a functional CSF-1 receptor, a member of the tyrosine kinase family. Without a functional CSF-1 receptors, stem cells cannot respond to CSF-1 stimuli and therefore cannot differentiate; interferons can cause a down regulation of the CSF-1 receptor. Additionally, without stimuli like LPS to induce macrophage maturation to M1 or M2, mice accumulate a large pool of monocytes, the precursor cells to macrophages, which are less helpful for macrophage-specific research
