= Hexyl benzoate =

Identifiers
CAS Number	6789-88-4
3D model (JSmol)	Interactive image
ChEBI	CHEBI:165206
ChEMBL	ChEMBL2260717
ChemSpider	21738
ECHA InfoCard	100.027.142
EC Number	229-856-5
PubChem CID	23235
UNII	VR3C36EKJR
CompTox Dashboard (EPA)	DTXSID9025403
- InChI: InChI=1S/C13H18O2/c1-2-3-4-8-11-15-13(14)12-9-6-5-7-10-12/h5-7,9-10H,2-4,8,11H2,1H3 Key: UUGLJVMIFJNVFH-UHFFFAOYSA-N
- SMILES: CCCCCCOC(=O)C1=CC=CC=C1

Properties
Chemical formula	C_{13}H_{18}O_{2}
Molar mass	206.285 g·mol^{−1}
Appearance	colorless
Density	0.9793 g/cm^{3}
Boiling point	272 °C (522 °F; 545 K)
Vapor pressure	32 mmHg
Refractive index (n_{D})	1.490-1.500

Hazards
Flash point	148 °C (298 °F; 421 K)
- Except where otherwise noted, data are given for materials in their standard state (at 25 °C [77 °F], 100 kPa). Infobox references

Hexyl benzoate is a synthetically made and naturally occurring organic compound belonging to the aromatic esters. It occurs naturally in several plants and fruits such as apricot, peach, guava, lingonberry, tea, and cashew. The compound is used as an ingredient in perfumes and flavorings.

== Properties ==
At room temperature, hexyl benzoate is a colorless liquid with an odor that has been described as fruity and melon-like or fresh and coniferous. The compound is practically insoluble in water, but is soluble in solvents such as ethanol, acetone, and dimethyl sulfoxide.

== Synthesis ==
Hexyl benzoate is prepared by the esterification reaction between hexanol and benzoic acid.

== Usage ==
Hexyl benzoate is used as a fixative in fragrances, such as perfumes and soaps. The compound can also be used as a food flavoring.
