= TUG-891 =

Identifiers
- IUPAC name: 3-[4-[[5-fluoro-2-(4-methylphenyl)phenyl]methoxy]phenyl]propanoic acid
- CAS Number: 1374516-07-0
- PubChem CID: 57522038
- IUPHAR/BPS: 6490
- ChemSpider: 28514850
- ChEMBL: ChEMBL2058533

Chemical and physical data
- Formula: C_{23}H_{21}FO_{3}
- Molar mass: 364.416 g·mol^{−1}
- 3D model (JSmol): Interactive image
- SMILES: CC1=CC=C(C=C1)C2=C(C=C(C=C2)F)COC3=CC=C(C=C3)CCC(=O)O
- InChI: InChI=1S/C23H21FO3/c1-16-2-7-18(8-3-16)22-12-9-20(24)14-19(22)15-27-21-10-4-17(5-11-21)6-13-23(25)26/h2-5,7-12,14H,6,13,15H2,1H3,(H,25,26); Key:LPGBXHWIQNZEJB-UHFFFAOYSA-N

TUG-891 is an experimental drug which acts as a potent and selective agonist for the free fatty acid receptor FFAR4 (GPR120). It has antiinflammatory effects and regulates metabolism, gastric peptide release and glucose homeostasis, and has been researched in animal models of conditions such as obesity, diabetes and atherosclerosis, as well as cancer. TUG-891 was one of the first selective FFAR4 agonists developed and while it is useful for in vitro research, it has poor stability in vivo, and so numerous compounds have been developed with improved properties using TUG-891 as the parent compound.
