= Telesta Therapeutics =

Telesta Therapeutics Inc.
- Formerly: Bioniche Life Sciences Inc.
- Type: Public
- Traded as: TSX: TST
- Industry: pharmaceutical
- Founded: 1 January 1979
- Defunct: 2016
- Fate: Acquired by ProMetic Life Sciences
- Headquarters: Pointe-Claire, Canada
- Key people: Michael Berendt (CEO, CSO)
- Website: www.telestatherapeutics.com

Telesta Therapeutics Inc. was a publicly traded, Canadian pharmaceutical company based in Montreal, Quebec. It was acquired by ProMetic Life Sciences in 2016.

CEO Michael Berendt; prior to joining Telesta, was the president and CEO of Aegera Therapeutics.

Telesta was listed on the Toronto Stock Exchange under the symbol TST.

== History ==
As part of the strategic push to focus on late stage human therapeutics, effective May 2014, the company divested its Animal Health unit to Vétoquinol, a family-owned, global animal health company led by CEO Matthieu Frechin.

In 2014, a court decision involving a group of Bioniche shareholders and the Bioniche board of directors established a precedent in the Canadian court system for conditions under which a board may choose not to select the date proposed by shareholders for an annual meeting, but rather schedule on a date of the board's choosing, thus confirming "that directors have wide latitude to manage corporate affairs."

In February 2016, the Biologics License Application of Telestra's main drug, MCNA, was rejected by the FDA. In response, the company started cutting staff, and attempted to find a buyer for its Belleville and Montreal production facilities. In August, Telesta was acquired by ProMetic Life Sciences for 14 cents a share.

== Operations ==
As of December 2014, the strategic focus of Telesta was on the commercialization of "Mycobacterium phlei cell-wall - nucleic acid complex" (MCNA) for the treatment of bladder cancer. The company pursued but did not secure orphan drug status via the United States Food and Drug Administration.

Telesta's Biologic license application for the drug MCNA (Mycobacterium phlei Cell Wall-Nucleic Acid Complex), formerly "Urocidin" was reviewed under the FDA Fast Track Development Program.

MCNA's safety profile is superior to the other available treatments after BCG-failure (1.5% Adverse event for MNCA compared to >30% AEs for Valrubicin (Valstar)). The drug MCNA had a 100% - 250% higher efficacy in the pivotal clinical trial than Valstar (<10% DFS for Valstar, 25% DFS for MCNA) and MCNA had a 35% DFS after a one-year treatment on papillary-only patients with NMIBC, which is 90% of all NMIBC cases.

With MCNA there is also the unique possibility for urologists to administer the drug immediately following TURBT, as opposed to weeks after with either BCG or Mitomycyn C. This means MCNA could kill free floating cancer cells and not give them the opportunity adhere to the bladder walls, after tumors have been removed.
