= Free fatty acid receptor 1 =

Protein-coding gene in the species Homo sapiens

FFAR1

Identifiers
- Aliases: FFAR1, FFA1R, GPCR40, GPR40, free fatty acid receptor 1
- External IDs: OMIM: 603820; MGI: 2684079; GeneCards: FFAR1
Available structures
PDB	Ortholog search: PDBe RCSB
PDB	List of PDB id codes 4PHU

Gene location (Human)
Chr.	Chromosome 19 (human)
Band	19q13.12	Start	35,347,902 bp
Band	19q13.12	End	35,353,864 bp

Gene location (Mouse)
Chr.	Chromosome 7 (mouse)
Band	7|7 B1	Start	30,556,815 bp
Band	7|7 B1	End	30,560,989 bp
RNA expression pattern
Bgee	Human / Mouse (ortholog); Top expressed in: islet of Langerhans; testicle; C1 segment; body of pancreas; left ovary; bone marrow; right ovary; granulocyte; substantia nigra; putamen / Top expressed in: islet of Langerhans; spleen; morula; jejunum; colon; ileum; blastocyst; lung; More reference expression data
BioGPS	n/a
Gene ontology
Molecular function	bioactive lipid receptor activity; G protein-coupled receptor activity; signal transducer activity; guanyl-nucleotide exchange factor activity; lipid binding
Cellular component	membrane; integral component of membrane; plasma membrane; integral component of plasma membrane
Biological process	G protein-coupled receptor signaling pathway; insulin secretion; response to fatty acid; glucose homeostasis; signal transduction; positive regulation of insulin secretion; positive regulation of calcium ion transport
Sources:Amigo / QuickGO
Orthologs
Databases	NCBI: entry; OMA: entry
Species	Human	Mouse
Entrez	2864	233081
Ensembl	ENSG00000126266	ENSMUSG00000044453
UniProt	O14842	Q76JU9
RefSeq (mRNA)	NM_005303	NM_194057
RefSeq (protein)	NP_005294	NP_918946
Location (UCSC)	Chr 19: 35.35 – 35.35 Mb	Chr 7: 30.56 – 30.56 Mb
PubMed search
- Wikidata
View/Edit Human	View/Edit Mouse

Free fatty acid receptor 1 (FFAR1), also known as G-protein coupled receptor 40 (GPR40), is a rhodopsin-like G-protein coupled receptor that is coded (i.e., its synthesis is directed) by the FFAR1 gene. This gene is located on the short (i.e., "q") arm of chromosome 19 at position 13.12 (location notated as 19q13.12). G protein-coupled receptors (also termed GPRs or GPCRs) reside on their parent cells' surface membranes, bind any one of the specific set of ligands that they recognize, and thereby are activated to trigger certain responses in their parent cells. FFAR1 is a member of a small family of structurally and functionally related GPRs termed free fatty acid receptors (FFARs). This family includes at least three other FFARs viz., FFAR2 (also termed GPR43), FFAR3 (also termed GPR41), and FFAR4 (also termed GPR120). FFARs bind and thereby are activated by certain fatty acids.

Studies suggest that FFAR1 may be involved in the development of obesity, type 2 diabetes, and various emotional, behavioral, learning, and cognition defects such as Alzheimer's disease. FFAR1 may also be involved in the perception of pain, the tastes of and preferences for eating fatty and sweet foods, the pathological replacement of injured tissue with fibrosis and scarring, and the malignant behavior, i.e., proliferation, invasiveness, and metastasis, of some types of cancer cells.

Various fatty acids, including in particular two omega-3 fatty acids, docosahexaenoic and eicosapentaenoic acids, have been consumed in diets and supplements for the purposes of preventing or treating the disorders that recent studies suggest are associated with abnormalities in FFAR1's functions. It is now known that these fatty acids activate (i.e. are agonists of) FFAR1 as well as FFAR4. While dietary and supplemental omega-3 fatty acids have had no or only marginally significant therapeutic effects on these disorders (see health effects of omega-3 fatty acid supplementation), drugs have been developed that are more potent and selective in activating FFAR1 than the omega-3 fatty acids. Furthermore, drugs have been developed that potently inhibit (i.e. are antagonists of) FFAR1. This raised the possibility that the drugs may be more effective than the omega-3 fatty acids in treating these diseases and prompted studies testing their effectiveness to do so. These studies, which are preclinical studies on cultured cells and animal models of disease plus some clinical studies, are detailed here.

== Activators and inhibitors of the free fatty acid receptors ==
FFARs are activated by specific types of fatty acids. FFAR2 and FFAR3 are activated by short-chain fatty acids (i.e., fatty acid chains consisting of 2 to 5 carbon atoms) such as acetic, butyric, and propionic acids. FFAR1 and FFAR4 are activated by 1) medium-chain fatty acids (i.e., fatty acids consisting of 6-12 carbon atoms) such as capric and lauric acids; 2) long-chain and very long-chain fatty acids (i.e. fatty acids consisting respectively of 13 to 21 or more than 21 carbon atoms) unsaturated fatty acids such as myristic and steric acids; 3) long chain monounsaturated fatty acidss such as oleic and palmitoleic acids; 4) long and very long chain polyunsaturated fatty acids such as the omega-3 fatty acids alpha-linolenic, eicosatrienoic, eicosapentaenoic, and docosahexaenoic acids and omega-6 fatty acids such as linoleic, gamma-linolenic, dihomo-gamma-linolenic, arachidonic, and docosatetraenoic acids; and 5) the omega hydroxy fatty acid, 20-hydroxyeicosatetraenoic acid. Among the fatty acids that activate FFAR1 (and FFAR4), docosahexaenoic and eicosapentaenoic acids are commonly regarded as the main dietary fatty acids that do so and may be useful therapeutic agents.

The drugs that are full agonists (i.e., can fully activate) FFAR1 include GW5809 (about 60-fold more potent in activating FFAR1 than FFAR4) and five drugs, AM 1638, AP8, compound 1 SCO-267, and T-3601386 which have no reports clearly defining their ability to activate FFAR4. The drugs that are partial agonists (i.e., activate but cannot fully activate) FFAR1 include TAK-875, also termed fasiglifam, which is >1,000 more potent in activating FFAR1 than FFAR4, MK‐8666, which activates FFAR1 and said to be less effective in activating FFAR4, and two drugs, AMG 837T and LY3104607 which have no reports clearly defining their ability to activate FFAR4. GW1100 and ANT203 are antagonist, i.e., inhibit the activation, of FFAR1 but do not inhibit FFAR4 and DC260126 which inhibits FFAR1 but its effect on FFAR4 has not been clearly reported. ZLY50 is a newly described selective FFAR1 agonist (>400 more potent in activating FFAR1 than FFAR4) that crosses the blood–brain barrier and therefore may prove useful for inhibiting FFAR1 on cells located in the central nervous system, i.e. brain and spinal cord.

Cells commonly express both FFAR1 and FFAR4. The fatty acids which activate these two FFARs, including docosahexaenoic and eicosapentaenoic acids, are about equally potent in activating FFAR1 and FFAR4; they also have diverse FFAR1-independent as well as FFAR4-independent means of altering cell functions. Furthermore, most of the studies on FFAR1 agonist drugs have used GW9508, a drug that activates FFAR1 but at higher concentrations also activates FFAR4. Finally, many of the FFAR1 agonists and antagonists have not been defined for their impact on FFAR4 and none of them have been fully evaluated for possible FFAR-independent means of altering cell functions. Accordingly, many FFAR1 studies have not clearly determined if the action(s) of a given fatty acid or drug involves FFAR1, FFAR4, both FFARs, FFAR-independent pathways, or combinations of these function-altering avenues. The studies reported here address these issues by focusing on those that included examinations of the effects of FFAR1 and FFAR4 inhibitors by themselves or as blockers of the actions of FFAR1 and FFAR4 and/or included experiments using cells or animals that lacked, under-expressed, or overexpressed FFAR1 or FFAR4.

== Cells and tissues expressing FFAR1 ==
FFAR1 is highly expressed in pancreas beta cells which produce and release insulin into the blood; pancreas alpha cells which produce and release glucagon, a hormone that increases blood glucose levels; enteroendocrine K, L, and I cells of the gastrointestinal tract which respectively produce and release glucagon-like peptide-1, gastric inhibitory peptide, and cholecystokinin which regulate insulin and blood glucose levels; monocytes and M2 macrophages which contribute to regulating immune responses such as inflammation; bone modeling cells (i.e. osteoblasts and osteoclasts); and taste receptor-bearing cells in the tongue's taste buds. FFAR1 is also expressed in bone marrow-derived macrophages; neurons in the central nervous system, e.g. the olfactory bulb, striatum, hippocampus, midbrain, hypothalamus, cerebellum, cerebral cortex, caudate nucleus and spinal cord; various cell types in the spleen; and various types of cancer cells.

== FFAR1 functions and activities ==
=== Fat tissue development and thermogenesis ===
Studies to date have implicated FFAR4 but not FFAR1 in the development and remodeling of fat tissue and in generating body heat, i.e., thermogenesis, by the brown fat component of fat tissue (see FFAR4) in rodents. Indeed, FRAR1 has not yet been reported to be expressed in the fat tissue of mice or humans.

=== Obesity ===
The following studies have suggested that FFAR1 contributes to the regulation of obesity. 1) Ffar1 gene knockout mice (i.e., mice made to lack Ffar1 genes) became obese when fed a low-fat diet whereas control mice became obese only when fed a high-fat diet. 2) The FFAR1 agonist SCO-267 reduced the food intake and body weights in diet-induced obese rats, in rats made diabetic by neonatal treatment with streptozotocin, and in obese mice but not in Ffar1 knockout obese mice. 3) Another FFAR1 agonist, T-3601386, likewise reduced the food intake and body weight in obese mice but not in Ffar1 gene knockout mice. 4) SNP genotyping is used to define single-nucleotide polymorphisms in order to detect germline substitutions of a single nucleotide at specific positions in all the genetic material of an organism. SNP genotyping found three variant FFAR1 gene SNPs in individuals with higher body weights, body mass indexes, and fatty tissue masses than individuals not carrying one of these SNP genes. The SNP gene carriers did not evidence abnormal insulin or pancreatic beta cell functions. This study suggested but did not show that the cited SNP FFAR1 protein variants were dysfunctional. And 5) a similar study found another SNP in the FFAR1 gene. This SNP replaced serine with glycine at the 180th amino acid of FFAR1. It and the more common FFAR1 protein it replaces are termed Gly180Ser and Gly180Gly, respectively. Gly180Ser FFAR1 was present in 0.42, 1.8, and 2.60% of non-obese, moderately obese, and severely obese individuals, respectively, and its carriers showed reduced plasma insulin responses to an oral lipid challenge. Studies on HeLa cells (i.e., cells derived from human cervical cancer cells) made to express Gly180Ser FFAR1 using transfection methods had significantly lower calcium mobilization responses to oleic acid than Hela cells transfected with Gly180Gly FFAR1. This suggests that Gly180Ser FFAR1 is dysfunctional. Modulation of the nutrient taste-sensing pathways (see below section on Taste) using foods, dietary supplements, or drugs that target FFAR1 (and FFAR4, see FFAR4-dependent taste perception) may prove useful for treating obesity and obesity-related disorders.

=== Type 2 diabetes ===
Studies have suggested that FFAR1 acts to suppress the development and/or pathological effects (e.g. inadequate insulin secretion) of type 2 diabetes. 1) Fatty acid activators of FFAR1/FFAR4 enhanced the glucose-stimulated secretion of insulin from cultured mouse pancreas beta-cells, INS-1 rat beta cells, mouse MIN6 beta cells (these cells like other beta cells make and release insulin but are genetically altered to also make and release glucagon, somatostatin, and ghrelin), and pancreatic islets isolated from humans. These fatty acid activators did not have this action in the absence of concurrent glucose stimulation. 2) The FFAR1 agonist TAK-875 increased the amount of insulin released by glucose-stimulated cultured INS-1 cells and isolated rat pancreatic islets. TAK-875 did not have this action in the absence of concurrent glucose stimulation. 3) The FFAR1 agonist AMG 837 stimulated mouse MIN6 cells to secrete insulin; it also reduce the rises in plasma glucose occurring in glucose tolerance tests in control but not Ffar1 gene knockout mice. 4) Other FFAR1 agonist drugs including TUG-424, AM-1638, AM-5262, LY2881835, MK-2305, and ZLY50 increased insulin secretion and improved glucose tolerance in mice, enhanced glucose-stimulated insulin secretion in mouse and human cultured pancreatic islet cells, and/or improved glucose levels in diabetic mice. 5) Ffar1 gene knockout mice had impaired secretion of glucagon-like peptide-1 and gastric inhibitory polypeptide into the circulation. These two hormones are secreted from intestinal L-cells and intestinal K-cells, respectively, when stimulated by dietary glucose or fatty acids and act to promote insulin secretion. And 6) Ffar1 gene knockout mice fed a high-fat diet for 11 weeks developed obesity, high fasting blood glucose levels, glucose intolerance, and insulin resistance; control mice feed the high fat diet did not develop these diabetic-like abnormalities. Thus, FFAR1 appears to regulate insulin secretion and blood glucose levels thereby suppressing the development and/or pathological consequences of type 2 diabetes in rodents.

A double‐blind (i.e., patients and researchers do not know if the patients are taking a drug or placebo), parallel study randomized 63 patients (mean age 55, ranging from 30 to 65 years old) with type 2 diabetes to take the GPR40 agonist MK‐8666 or a placebo for 14 days. MK-8666-treated patients had fasting blood glucose levels that were well below pre-treatment levels by the last treatment day. Placebo-treated patients showed no changes in their blood glucose levels. Among the MK-866-treated patients, 18 instances of mild to moderate drug‐related adverse events (i.e., pain in the back, neck, extremity, and/or abdomen; headache; constipation; nausea; and diarrhea) occurred. However, one patient developed elevations in the blood levels of three liver enzymes, alanine aminotransferase, aspartate aminotransferase and alkaline phosphatase. Elevations in these enzymes' blood levels suggest the presence of liver damage (see liver function tests). The patient continued to take MK-8666 for the 14 day treatment period; two weeks thereafter these enzymes returned to normal levels. The study concluded that this case may have reflected mild MK-8666-induced liver damage. The sponsor, Merck & Co., terminated further development of MK-8666 due to it having a possibly unfavorable risk–benefit ratio in type 2 diabetic patients. A study conducted in Japan on 1,222 adults with inadequately controlled (i.e. high blood sugar levels) type 2 diabetes were treated with the highly selective FFAR1 agonist TAK-875 in addition to their in-place treatment regimens for 1 year. Blood sugar levels improved 2 weeks after taking the drug and remained improved throughout the study. However, adverse events that emerged during treatment leading to discontinuance of TAK-875 varied between 2.9% and 9.2% depending on the patients' treatment regimens; the incidence of abnormal liver function tests during the trial varied between 0% and 5.8%, again depending on treatment regimens. Further development of TAK-875 was stopped due to concerns about its possible hepatotoxicity. A recent review of data from TAK-875 global clinical trials by an independent panel of experts overseeing the clinical development program also had concerns about liver safety. A simulated analysis of these studies suggested that this liver toxicity reflected the inhibition of liver bile acid transporters and mitochondrial electron transport chain enzymes by TAK-875 and its glycosylated metabolite, TAK-875-glucose. The results of these studies have been regarded as proof of the concept that FFAR1 contributes to the regulation of glucose levels in patients with type 2 diabetes and therefore is a potential target for treating these patients with FFAR1 agonists that do not have significant adverse effects such as hepatotoxicity. Recent preclinical studies are examining other FFAR1 agonists for their liver and other toxicities.

=== Taste ===
The main detectors and mediators of the five major taste perception elements viz., saltiness, sourness, bitterness, sweetness, and umami, are the cell-bound GPRs TAS1R2/TAS1R3, TAS1R1/TAS1R3, and multiple subtypes of TAS2R for sweetness, umami, and bitterness, respectively, and selective cell-bound ion channels for saltiness and sourness. However, studies indicate that the taste of substances sometimes involves more than one taste-detecting element. For example, taste of the artificial the sweetener saccharin appears to be detected by a combination of sweetness and bitterness elements. Cells bearing these taste receptors are on the tongue's upper surface, soft palate, upper esophagus, cheek, and epiglottis (see Taste buds). FFAR1 and FFAR4 appear to contribute to some types of taste perception in rodents. 1) Taste bud cells in the back of rodents' tongues express FFAR1 while cells in the epithelium of their tongues' circumvallate papillae express FFAR4. 2) Ffar1 and Ffar4 gene knockout mice had diminished taste responses to various fatty acids and a lower preference for consuming these fatty acids. 3) Ffar1 gene knockdown mice had a reduced intake and preference for sucrose in sucrose preference tests. 4) Human tongue taste bud cells contain FFAR4 but inconclusive studies suggest it may lack FFAR1. And 5) a selective activator of FFAR4, TUG-891, enhanced human's fatty orosensation (i.e., false sensation of taste obtained by tongue stimulation) when added to FFAR4-activating dietary fats but not when added to fat-free mineral oil. This finding suggests that in humans FFAR4 activation enhances but does not directly evoke a sensation of fats. Thus, FFAR1 and FFAR4 appear to mediate fatty acid taste perceptions and FFAR1 appears to mediate sweetness taste perception in rodents; taste bud FFAR4 but not FFAR1 appears to enhance the perception of fatty acids and fatty oils in humans. Further studies are needed to define the presence, locations, and precise roles of FFAR1 and FFAR4 in the various taste perceptions of animals and humans.

=== Central nervous system ===
FFAR1 is expressed on the neurons and some other cell types in the olfactory bulb, striatum, hippocampus, midbrain, hypothalamus, cerebellum, cerebral cortex, and caudate nucleus of the brain as well as in the spinal cord. FFAR1-activating fatty acids, particularly docosahexaenoic acid, are thought to play critical roles in neurons by maintaining their surface membrane integrity, survival, synaptic functions (synapses are specialize parts of neurons which communicate with other neurons), ion channel functions (e.g. communication between cells), and in suppressing the development of certain central nervous system disorders. However, it is often not clear that docosahexaenoic acid achieves these effects by activating FFAR1. The following studies have implicated FFAR1 in various central nervous system functions and/or disorders. 1) Ffar1 gene knockout mice showed abnormally reduced anxiety-like behavior in anxiety-inducing tasks compared to control mice. 2) Ffar1 gene knockout female mice had abnormally low anxiety responses, abnormally low locomotor activity, and impaired maternal care behavior (i.e., higher rates of offspring neglect and infanticide) compared to control female mice. 3) Obese, diabetic male C57BL6/J mice and db/db obese, diabetic mice (an animal disease model) have fear-associated learning and memory impairments as determined in various behavioral tests; GW5908 and docosahexaenoic acid reduced these impairments and GW1100 blocked docosahexaenoic acid's effects on learning and memory. 4) GW9508 completely restored the learning and memory of mice that had impaired learning and memory due to scopolamine treatment. 5) GW9508 reduced the cognitive deficits in A-beta AD mice (i.e. a mouse model of Alzheimer's disease); this reduction was blocked by treating the mice with GW1100. 6) GW9508 similarly improved learning and memory in A-beta AD mice evaluated with other cognition tests. And 7) the highly selective FFAR1 agonist TAK-875 reduced the cognitive impairments that occur in APPswe/PS1dE9 mice (another model of Alzheimer disease). These results suggest that FFAR1 may be, and should be evaluated as, a potentile target for the treatment of brain developmental, emotional, and mental impairments such as Alzheimer's disease.

=== Pain perception ===
Studies suggest that FFAR1 is involved in nociception, i.e., the perception of pain. 1) Oral administration of the FFAR1 agonist ZLY50 (which unlike most drugs crosses from the circulation into the central nervous systems' spinal fluid) reduced the pain responses of mice in three pain tests. 2) Injection of the FFAR1 agonist GW9508 into the spinal canal of rats decreased their pain response to spinal nerve ligation and heat; the pain-reducing action of GW9508 on spinal nerve ligation was blocked by the FFAR1 antagonist GW1100 but not the FFAR4 antagonist AH7614. 3) Ffar1 gene knockout mice as well as mice treated with the FFAR1 inhibitor GW1100 had enhanced pain responses in two pain tests. 4) And the intracerebroventricular injection (i.e., injection into a brain ventricle) of docosahexaenoic acid or GW9508 reduced the pain responses of mice to painful pressure on a paw and to radiant heat; their effects were blocked by intracerebroventricular injections of GW1100. These studies suggest that FFAR1 is involved in reducing rodent pain perception and recommend testing for its involvement in the perception of pain in humans.

=== Cancer ===
Many studies have suggested that FFAR1 alters the malignant behavior of some types of cultured cancer cells. These malignant behaviors include cultured cancer cell motility and proliferation which are regarded as being related to the invasiveness and growth rate, respectively, of cancers in animals and humans. 1) GW9508, which activates FFAR1 but at higher concentrations also activates FFAR4, stimulated the motility of mouse LL/2 and rat RLCNR lung cancer cells; treatment of these cells with GW9508 plus GW1100 reduced these cells motility to levels below GW9508-treated and GW9508-untreated LL/2 and RLCNR cells. (In the presence of GW1100, GW9508 is assumed to act through FFAR4 but not FFAR1.) 2) GW9508 reduced the motility of A549 human lung cancer cells; GW9508 plus GW1100 treatment of these cells further reduced their motility; FFAR1 gene knockdown A549 cells showed less motility than control A549 cells; and GW9508-treated A549 FFAR1 gene knockdown cells had less motility than control or GW9508-treated cells. (GW9508 is assumed to act through FFAR4, not FFAR1, in FFAR1 gene knockdown or GW1100-treated cells.) 3) GW9508 did not alter the proliferation of LL/2, RLCNR, or A549 cells but in combination with GW1100 slightly decreased the proliferation of A549 but not LL/2 or RLCNR cells. These three sets of results suggest that FFAR1 enhances while FFAR4 inhibits the motility of LL/2, RLCNR, and A549 cells and that FFAR4 reduces A549 but not LL/2 or RLCNR cell proliferation. 4) Similar studies using the FFAR4 agonist TUG-891 and eicosapentaenoic acid in control and FFAR4 gene knockdown human DU145 and PC-3 prostate cancer cells suggested that FFA4 promotes these cells motility and proliferation. 5) GW9508 inhibited the motility of hamster pancreas cancer HPD1NR cells (which express FFAR1 but not FFAR4), stimulated the motility of hamster pancreas HPD2NR cancer cells (which express FFAR4 but not FFAR1), and slightly inhibited the motility of human PANC-1 pancreas cancer cells (which express FFAR1 and FFAR4). GW9508 markedly increased the motility of PANC-1 cells when they were also treated with GW1100. These results indicate that FFAR1 inhibits while FFA4 promotes motility in the three types of rodent pancreas cancer cells. And 6) studies in MG-63 human osteosarcoma (i.e. bone cancer) cells and the far more highly mobile MG63-R7 human osteosacromea cells suggest that FFAR1 inhibits and FFAR4 promotes motility. The latter three sets of results indicate that the roles of FFAR1 and FFAR4 in regulating cancer cell motility vary with the types of cancer cells studied.) Finally, studies in patients have shown that FFAR1 is overexpressed in some insulinomas (i.e. cancers derived from pancreas beta cells), in high grade and/or advanced stage ovarian cancers, and in high grade, advanced stage, and/or poor prognosis colorectal cancers. The overexpression of FFAR1 in these cancers suggests that it may play a role in their development and/or progression,

==== Breast cancer ====
FFAR1 and FFAR4 are expressed in human MDA-MB-231, MCF-7, and SK-BR-3 breast cancer cells and appear to regulate some of their and other types of breast cancer cells' malignant behaviors. 1) MDA-MB-231 cells that did not express FFAR1 (due to FFAR1 gene knockdown) or overexpressed FFRA1 (due to transfection with a FFAR1-producing plasmid) had lower and higher proliferation responses, respectively, to the FFAR1/FFAR4 activator, oleic acid, compared to control MDA-MB-231 cells. 2) T-47D human breast cancer cells (which express very low levels of FFAR4) and MCF-7 cells transfected with the FFAR-1-producing plasmid had increased proliferative responses to oleic acid compared to control cells. 3) The highly selective FFAR4 agonist TUG-891 reduced the proliferation of MCF-7 and MDA-MB-231 cells. 4) GW9508 increased the motility of FFAR4 knockdown MCF-7 and SK-BR-3 breast cancer cells compared to their respective control (i.e., FFAR4-expressing) MCF7 and SK-BR-3 cells. 5) GW9508 increased the development of lung tumors in nude mice injected with control MDA-MB-231 cells but did not do so in nude mice injected with FFAR4 knockdown MDA-MB-231 cells. These studies suggest that FFAR1 promotes the proliferation but inhibits the motility and FFAR4 promotes the motility and lung metastasis of human breast cancer cells. And 6) Clinical studies have reported that FFAR4 levels are higher in certain types of more aggressive human breast cancers and therefore may be a marker of disease severity and a target for treating these cancers (see FFAR4 in breast cancer). Similar studies on FFAR1 in human breast cancer are needed to determine its medical relevancy.

=== Tissue fibrosis ===
Recent studies suggest that FFAR1 is involved in pathological tissue fibrosis, i.e., the healing of tissue injury in which connective tissue replaces normal tissue leading to tissue remodeling, the formation of permanent scar tissue, and damaged organs. 1) Ffar1 gene knockout mice were protected from developing fibrotic kidneys in three models of this disease (unilateral obstruction of a single kidney's ureter, long-term kidney ischemia due to reducing blood flow to a single kidney, and adenine diet-induced chronic fibrotic kidney disease). 2) PBI-4050 (i.e., 3-pentylbenzeneacetic acid sodium salt), a FFAR1 agonist, blocked the development of fibrosis in rodent kidney, liver, heart, lung, pancreas, and skin models of pathological fibrosis. 3) In a model of non-alcoholic fatty liver disease. Ffar1 gene knockout mice developed less liver inflammation and fibrosis than control mice. And 4) topical application of GW5908 to small skin biopsy-like wounds (also termed punch wounds) in the skin of male mice increased the levels of type I collagen in the wound tissues; however it also decreased the size of these wounds and increased the speed with which the wounds healed. This last observation suggests that GW5908 can have positive as well as negative effects on the resolution of tissue injury. Note, however, that the role(s) of FFAR1 versus FFAR4 in the actions of GW9808 in this study was not defined. Overall, these studies suggest that FFAR1 may be a target for suppressing the development and/or progression of pathological tissue fibrosis.

== Ligands ==
Agonists

- AP8
- Fasiglifam (TAK-875) (partial agonist)
- GW9508 (mixed agonist for FFAR1 and FFAR4, though with higher affinity for FFAR1)
- MK-2305
- SCO-267
- Setogepram
- TUG-424

Antagonists

- DC260126
- GW-1100

== See also ==
- Free fatty acid receptor
- Free fatty acid receptor 4
