= Docosatetraenoic acid =

22-Carbon polyunsaturated fatty acid

Adrenic acid
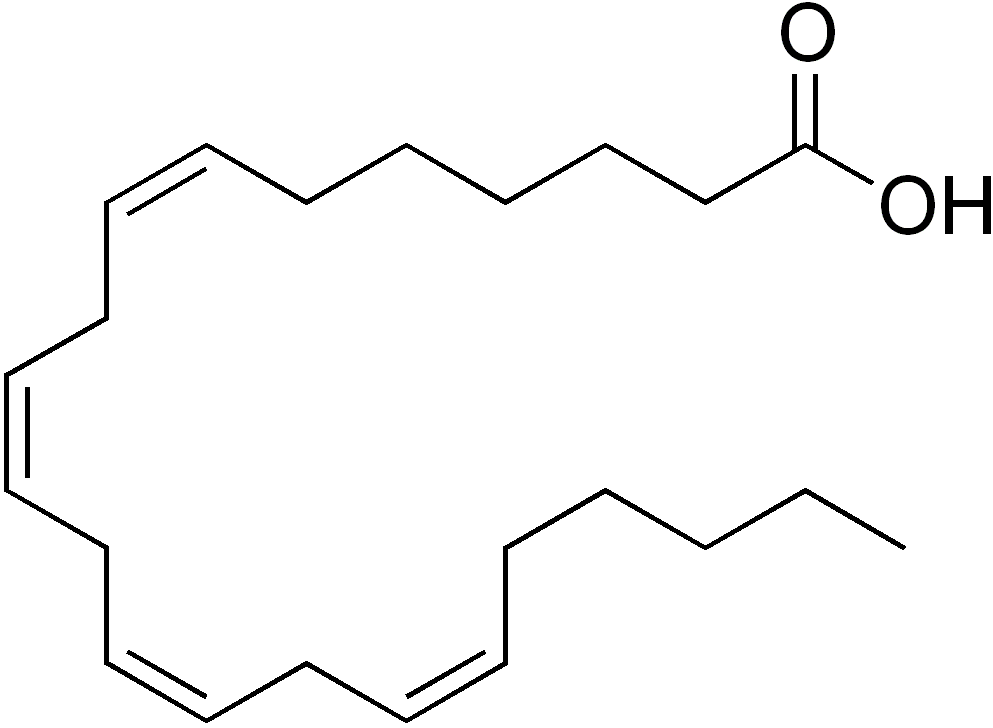

Names
- Preferred IUPAC name (7Z,10Z,13Z,16Z)-Docosa-7,10,13,16-tetraenoic acid

Identifiers
CAS Number	28874-58-0
3D model (JSmol)	Interactive image
ChemSpider	4593749
PubChem CID	5497181
UNII	64F675W6EN
CompTox Dashboard (EPA)	DTXSID80912354
- InChI: InChI=1S/C22H36O2/c1-2-3-4-5-6-7-8-9-10-11-12-13-14-15-16-17-18-19-20-21-22(23)24/h6-7,9-10,12-13,15-16H,2-5,8,11,14,17-21H2,1H3,(H,23,24)/b7-6-,10-9-,13-12-,16-15- Key: TWSWSIQAPQLDBP-DOFZRALJSA-N; InChI=1/C22H36O2/c1-2-3-4-5-6-7-8-9-10-11-12-13-14-15-16-17-18-19-20-21-22(23)24/h6-7,9-10,12-13,15-16H,2-5,8,11,14,17-21H2,1H3,(H,23,24)/b7-6-,10-9-,13-12-,16-15- Key: TWSWSIQAPQLDBP-DOFZRALJBY
- SMILES: OC(CCCCC/C=C\C/C=C\C/C=C\C/C=C\CCCCC)=O

Properties
Chemical formula	C_{22}H_{36}O_{2}
Molar mass	332.5 g/mol
- Except where otherwise noted, data are given for materials in their standard state (at 25 °C [77 °F], 100 kPa). verify (what is ?) Infobox references

Docosatetraenoic acid designates any straight chain 22:4 fatty acid. (See Essential fatty acid for nomenclature.)

One isomer is of particular interest:

- all-cis-7,10,13,16-docosatetraenoic acid is an ω-6 fatty acid with the common name adrenic acid (AdA). This is a naturally occurring polyunsaturated fatty acid formed through a 2-carbon chain elongation of arachidonic acid. It is one of the most abundant fatty acids in the early human brain. This unsaturated fatty acid is also metabolized by cells to biologically active products viz., dihomoprostaglandins, and epoxydocosatrienoic acids (EDTs, also known as dihomo-EETs). In addition to being endothelium-derived hyperpolarizing factors, EDTs have demonstrated anti-endoplasmic reticulum stress and anti-nociceptive activities. They are hydrolyzed by the soluble epoxide hydrolase (sEH) to dihydroxydocosatrienoic acids (DHDTs) and hence might play a role in the efficacy of sEH inhibitors.

== See also ==
- Polyunsaturated fat
- Docosanoid § DTA-derived docosanoids
