= Eicosatrienoic acid =

Eicosatrienoic acid (or icosatrienoic acid) denotes any straight chain polyunsaturated fatty acid (PUFA) that contains 20 carbons and 3 double bonds.
Examples important in biology, pharmacy or physiology:

- Dihomo-γ-linolenic acid, (8Z,11Z,14Z)-eicosatrienoic acid
- Mead acid, (5Z,8Z,11Z)-eicosatrienoic acid
- Sciadonic acid, (5Z,11Z,14Z)-eicosatrienoic acid

== See also ==
- Epoxyeicosatrienoic acid
