= Free fatty acid receptor =

G-protein coupled receptor which binds free fatty acids

free fatty acid receptor 1

Identifiers
- Symbol: FFAR1, FFA1R
- Alt. symbols: GPR40
- NCBI gene: 2864
- HGNC: 4498
- OMIM: 603820
- RefSeq: NM_005303
- UniProt: O14842

Other data
- Locus: Chr. 19 q13.1
Search for
- Structures: Swiss-model
- Domains: InterPro

free fatty acid receptor 2

Identifiers
- Symbol: FFAR2
- Alt. symbols: GPR43, FFA2R
- NCBI gene: 2867
- HGNC: 4501
- OMIM: 603823
- RefSeq: NM_005306
- UniProt: O15552

Other data
- Locus: Chr. 19 q13.1
Search for
- Structures: Swiss-model
- Domains: InterPro

free fatty acid receptor 3

Identifiers
- Symbol: FFAR3
- Alt. symbols: GPR41, FFA3R
- NCBI gene: 2865
- HGNC: 4499
- OMIM: 603821
- RefSeq: NM_005304
- UniProt: O14843

Other data
- Locus: Chr. 19 q13.1
Search for
- Structures: Swiss-model
- Domains: InterPro

free fatty acid receptor 4

Identifiers
- Symbol: FFAR4
- Alt. symbols: BMIQ10, GPR120, GPR129, GT01, O3FAR1, PGR4, free fatty acid receptor 4
- NCBI gene: 338557
- OMIM: 609044
- RefSeq: NM_181745
- UniProt: Q5NUL3

Other data
- Locus: Chr. 10 q23.33
Search for
- Structures: Swiss-model
- Domains: InterPro

G protein-coupled receptor 42

Identifiers
- Symbol: GPR42
- Alt. symbols: GPR41L, FFAR1L
- NCBI gene: 2866
- HGNC: 4500
- OMIM: 603822
- RefSeq: NM_005305
- UniProt: O15529

Other data
- Locus: Chr. 19 q31.1
Search for
- Structures: Swiss-model
- Domains: InterPro

Free fatty acid receptors (FFARs) are G-protein coupled receptors (GPRs). GPRs (also termed seven-(pass)-transmembrane domain receptors) are a large family of receptors. They reside on their parent cells' surface membranes, bind any one of a specific set of ligands that they recognize, and thereby are activated to elicit certain types of responses in their parent cells. Humans express more than 800 different types of GPCRs. FFARs are GPCR that bind and thereby become activated by particular fatty acids. In general, these binding/activating fatty acids are straight-chain fatty acids consisting of a carboxylic acid residue, i.e., -COOH, attached to aliphatic chains, i.e. carbon atom chains of varying lengths with each carbon being bound to 1, 2 or 3 hydrogens (CH1, CH2, or CH3). For example, propionic acid is a short-chain fatty acid consisting of 3 carbons (C's), CH3-CH2-COOH, and docosahexaenoic acid is a very long-chain polyunsaturated fatty acid consisting of 22 C's and six double bonds (double bonds notated as "="): CH3-CH2-CH1=CH1-CH2-CH1=CH1-CH2-CH1=CH1-CH2-CH1=CH1-CH2-CH1=CH1-CH2-CH1=CH1-CH2-CH2-COOH.

Currently, four FFARs are recognized: FFAR1, also termed GPR40; FFAR2, also termed GPR43; FFAR3, also termed GPR41; and FFAR4, also termed GPR120. The human FFAR1, FFAR2, and FFAR3 genes are located close to each other on the long (i.e., "q") arm of chromosome 19 at position 23.33 (notated as 19q23.33). This location also includes the GPR42 gene (previously termed the FFAR1L, FFAR3L, GPR41L, and GPR42P gene). This gene appears to be a segmental duplication of the FFAR3 gene. The human GPR42 gene codes for several proteins with a FFAR3-like structure but their expression in various cell types and tissues as well as their activities and functions have not yet been clearly defined. Consequently, none of these proteins are classified as an FFAR. The human FFAR4 gene is located on the long (i.e. "q") arm of chromosome 10 (notated as 10q23.33).

FFAR2 and FFAR3 bind and are activated by short-chain fatty acids, i.e., fatty acid chains consisting of 6 or less carbon atoms such as acetic, butyric, propionic, pentanoic, and hexanoic acids. β-hydroxybutyric acid has been reported to stimulate or inhibit FFAR3. FFAR1 and FFAR4 bind to and are activated by medium-chain fatty acids (i.e., fatty acids consisting of 6-12 carbon atoms) such as lauric and capric acids and long-chain or very long-chain fatty acids (i.e., fatty acids consisting respectively of 13 to 21 or more than 21 carbon atoms) such as myristic, steric, oleic, palmitic, palmitoleic, linoleic, alpha-linolenic, dihomo-gamma-linolenic, eicosatrienoic, arachidonic (also termed eicosatetraenoic acid), eicosapentaenoic, docosatetraenoic, docosahexaenoic, and 20-hydroxyeicosatetraenoic acids. Among the fatty acids that activate FFAR1 and FFAR4, docosahexaenoic and eicosapentaenoic acids are regarded as the main fatty acids that do so.

Many of the FFAR-activating fatty acids also activate other types of GPRs. The actual GPR activated by a fatty acid must be identified in order to understand its and the activated GPR's function. The following section gives the non-FFAR GPRs that are activated by FFAR-activating fatty acids. One of the best, and most used, ways of showing that a fatty acid's action is due to a specific GPR is to show that the fatty acid's action is either absent or significantly reduced in cells, tissues, or animals that have no or significantly reduced activity due, respectively, to the knockout (i.e., total removal or inactivation) or knockdown (i.e., significant depression ) of the gene's GPR protein that mediates the fatty acid's action.

== Other GPRs activated by FFAR-activating fatty acids ==
GPR84 binds and is activated by medium-chain fatty acids consisting of 9 to 14 carbon atoms such as capric, undecanoic, and lauric acids. It has been recognized as a possible member of the free fatty acid receptor family in some publications but has not yet been given this designation, perhaps because these medium-chain fatty acid activators require very high concentrations (e.g., in the micromolar range) to activate it. This allows that there may be a naturally occurring agent (or agents) that activates GPR84 at lower concentrations than the cited fatty acids. Consequently, GPR89 remains classified as an orphan receptor, i.e., a receptor whose naturally occurring activator(s) is unclear.

GPR109A is also termed hydroxycarboxylic acid receptor 2, niacin receptor 1, HM74a, HM74b, and PUMA-G. GPR109A binds and thereby is activated by the short-chain fatty acids, butyric, β-hydroxybutyric, pentanoic, and hexanoic acids and by the intermediate-chain fatty acids heptanoic and octanoic acids. GPR109A is also activated by niacin, but only at levels that are in general too low to activate it unless it is given as a drug in high doses.

GPR81 (also termed hydroxycarboxylic acid receptor 1, HCAR1, GPR104, GPR81, LACR1, TA-GPCR, TAGPCR, and FKSG80) binds and is activated by the short-chain fatty acids, lactic acid and β-hydroxybutyric acid. A more recent study reported that it is also activated by the compound 3,5-dihydroxybenzoic acid.

GPR109B (also known as hydroxycarboxylic acid receptor 3, HCA3, niacin receptor 2, and NIACR2) binds and is activated by the medium-chain fatty acid, 3-hydroxyoctanoate, niacin, and by four compounds viz., hippuric acid, 4-hydroxyphenyllactic acid, phenylacetic acid, and indole-3-lactic acid. The latter three compounds are produced by the Lactobacillus and Bifidobacterium species of bacteria that occupy the gastrointestinal tracts of animals and humans.

GPR91 (also termed the succinic acid receptor, succinate receptor, or SUCNR1) is activated most potently by the short-chain dicarboxylic fatty acid, succinic acid; the short-chain fatty acids, oxaloacetic, malic, and α-ketoglutaric acids are less potent activators of GPR91.
