= Rhodopsin-like receptors =

Family of proteins

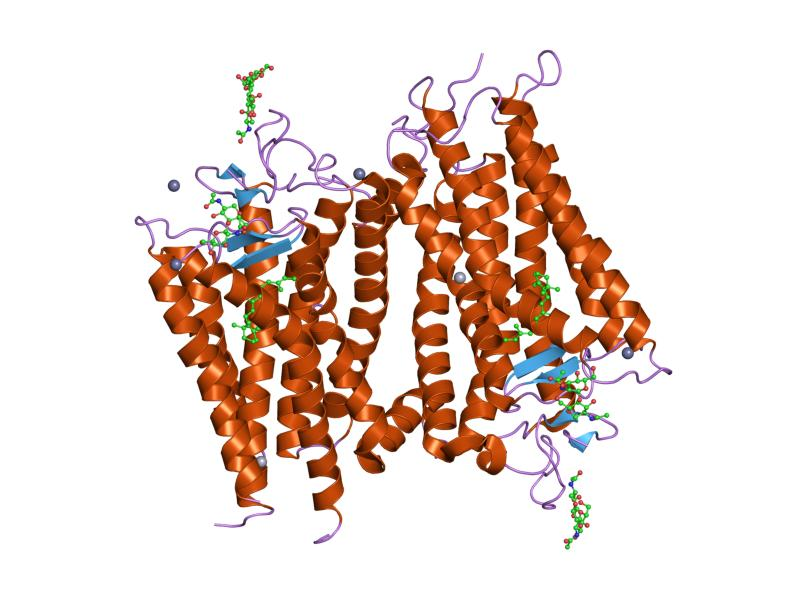
- Structure of rhodopsin: A G protein-coupled receptor

Identifiers
- Symbol: 7tm_1
- Pfam: PF00001
- Pfam clan: GPCR_A
- InterPro: IPR000276
- PROSITE: PDOC00211
- SCOP2: 1f88 / SCOPe / SUPFAM
- OPM superfamily: 6
- OPM protein: 1gzm
- CDD: cd00637
Available protein structures:
- PDB: 1U19 2R4R 2R4S 2RH1 1f88, 1hzx, 1l9h, 2g87, 2hpy, 2i35, 2i36, 2i37, 2j4y, 2ped IPR000276 PF00001 (ECOD; PDBsum)
- AlphaFold: IPR000276; PF00001

Rhodopsin-like receptors are a family of proteins that comprise the largest group of G protein-coupled receptors.

== Scope ==
G-protein-coupled receptors, GPCRs, constitute a vast protein family that encompasses a wide range of functions (including various autocrine, paracrine, and endocrine processes). They show considerable diversity at the sequence level, on the basis of which they can be separated into distinct groups. GPCRs are usually described as "superfamily" because they embrace a group of families for which there are indications of evolutionary relationship, but between which there is no statistically significant similarity in sequence. The currently known superfamily members include the rhodopsin-like GPCRs (this family), the secretin-like GPCRs, the cAMP receptors, the fungal mating pheromone receptors, and the metabotropic glutamate receptor family. There is a specialised database for GPCRs.

== Function ==
The rhodopsin-like GPCRs themselves represent a widespread protein family that includes hormone, neuropeptide, neurotransmitter, and light receptors, all of which transduce extracellular signals through interaction with guanine nucleotide-binding (G) proteins. Although their activating ligands vary widely in structure and character, the amino acid sequences of the receptors are very similar and are believed to adopt a common structural framework comprising 7 transmembrane (TM) helices.

== Classes ==
Rhodopsin-like GPCRs have been classified into the following 19 subgroups (A1-A19) based on a phylogenetic analysis.

=== Subfamily A1 ===
- Chemokine receptor InterPro: IPR000355
  - Chemokine (C-C motif) receptor 1 (CCR1, CKR1)
  - Chemokine (C-C motif) receptor 2 (CCR2, CKR2)
  - Chemokine (C-C motif) receptor 3 (CCR3, CKR3)
  - Chemokine (C-C motif) receptor 4 (CCR4, CKR4)
  - Chemokine (C-C motif) receptor 5 (CCR5, CKR5)
  - Chemokine (C-C motif) receptor 8 (CCR8, CKR8)
  - Chemokine (C-C motif) receptor-like 2 (CCRL2, CKRX)
- chemokine (C motif) receptor 1 (XCR1, CXC1) InterPro: IPR005393
- chemokine (C-X3-C motif) receptor 1 (CX3CR1, C3X1) InterPro: IPR005387
- GPR137B (GPR137B, TM7SF1)

=== Subfamily A2 ===
- Chemokine receptor InterPro: IPR000355
  - Chemokine (C-C motif) receptor-like 1 (CCRL1 CCRL1, CCR11)
  - Chemokine (C-C motif) receptor 6 (CCR6, CKR6)
  - Chemokine (C-C motif) receptor 7 (CCR7, CKR7)
  - Chemokine (C-C motif) receptor 9 (CCR9, CKR9)
  - Chemokine (C-C motif) receptor 10 (CCR10, CKRA)
- CXC chemokine receptors InterPro: IPR001053
  - Chemokine (C-X-C motif) receptor 3 (CXCR3)
  - Chemokine (C-X-C motif) receptor 4 (CXCR4, Fusin)
  - Chemokine (C-X-C motif) receptor 5 (CXCR5)
  - Chemokine (C-X-C motif) receptor 6 (CXCR6, BONZO)
  - Chemokine (C-X-C motif) receptor 7 (CXCR7, RDC1) InterPro: IPR001416
- Interleukin-8 InterPro: IPR000174 (IL8R)
  - IL8R-α (IL8RA, CXCR1)
  - IL8R-β (IL8RB, CXCR2)
- Adrenomedullin receptor (GPR182)
- Duffy blood group, chemokine receptor (DARC, DUFF)
- G Protein-coupled Receptor 30 (GPER, CML2, GPCR estrogen receptor)

=== Subfamily A3 ===
- Angiotensin II receptor InterPro: IPR000248
  - Angiotensin II receptor, type 1 (AGTR1, AG2S)
  - Angiotensin II receptor, type 2 (AGTR2, AG22)
  - Apelin receptor (AGTRL1, APJ) InterPro: IPR003904
- Bradykinin receptor InterPro: IPR000496
  - Bradykinin receptor B1 (BDKRB1, BRB1)
  - Bradykinin receptor B2 (BDKRB2, BRB2)
- GPR15 (GPR15, GPRF)
- GPR25 (GPR25)

=== Subfamily A4 ===
- Opioid receptor InterPro: IPR001418
  - delta Opioid receptor (OPRD1, OPRD)
  - kappa Opioid receptor (OPRK1, OPRK)
  - mu Opioid receptor (OPRM1, OPRM)
  - Nociceptin receptor (OPRL1, OPRX)
- Somatostatin receptor InterPro: IPR000586
  - Somatostatin receptor 1 (SSTR1, SSR1)
  - Somatostatin receptor 2 (SSTR2, SSR2)
  - Somatostatin receptor 3 (SSTR3, SSR3)
  - Somatostatin receptor 4 (SSTR4, SSR4)
  - Somatostatin receptor 5 (SSTR5, SSR5)
- GPCR neuropeptide receptor InterPro: IPR009150
  - Neuropeptides B/W receptor 1 (NPBWR1, GPR7)
  - Neuropeptides B/W receptor 2 (NPBWR2, GPR8)
- Chemerin-like receptor 2 (CMKLR2) InterPro: IPR002275

=== Subfamily A5 ===
- Galanin receptor InterPro: IPR000405
  - Galanin receptor 1 (GALR1, GALR)
  - Galanin receptor 2 (GALR2, GALS)
  - Galanin receptor 3 (GALR3, GALT)
- Cysteinyl leukotriene receptor InterPro: IPR004071
  - Cysteinyl leukotriene receptor 1 (CYSLTR1)
  - Cysteinyl leukotriene receptor 2 (CYSLTR2)
- Leukotriene B4 receptor InterPro: IPR003981
  - Leukotriene B4 receptor (LTB4R, P2Y7)
  - Leukotriene B4 receptor 2 (LTB4R2)
- Relaxin receptor InterPro: IPR008112
  - Relaxin/insulin-like family peptide receptor 1 (RXFP1, LGR7)
  - Relaxin/insulin-like family peptide receptor 2 (RXFP2, GPR106)
  - Relaxin/insulin-like family peptide receptor 3 (RXFP3, SALPR)
  - Relaxin/insulin-like family peptide receptor 4 (RXFP4, GPR100/GPR142)
- KiSS1-derived peptide receptor (GPR54) (KISS1R) InterPro: IPR008103
- Melanin-concentrating hormone receptor 1 (MCHR1, GPRO) InterPro: IPR008361
- Urotensin-II receptor (UTS2R, UR2R) InterPro: IPR000670

=== Subfamily A6 ===
- Cholecystokinin receptor InterPro: IPR009126
  - Cholecystokinin A receptor (CCKAR, CCKR)
  - Cholecystokinin B receptor (CCKBR, GASR)
- Neuropeptide FF receptor InterPro: IPR005395
  - Neuropeptide FF receptor 1 (NPFFR1, FF1R)
  - Neuropeptide FF receptor 2 (NPFFR2, FF2R)
- Orexin receptor InterPro: IPR000204
  - Hypocretin (orexin) receptor 1 (HCRTR1, OX1R)
  - Hypocretin (orexin) receptor 2 (HCRTR2, OX2R)
- Vasopressin receptor InterPro: IPR001817
  - Arginine vasopressin receptor 1A (AVPR1A, V1AR)
  - Arginine vasopressin receptor 1B (AVPR1B, V1BR)
  - Arginine vasopressin receptor 2 (AVPR2, V2R)
  - Oxytocin receptor (OXTR)
- Gonadotropin releasing hormone receptor (GNRHR, GRHR) InterPro: IPR001658
- Pyroglutamylated RFamide peptide receptor (QRFPR, GPR103)
- GPR22 (GPR22, GPRM)
- GPR176 (GPR176, GPR)

=== Subfamily A7 ===
- Bombesin receptor InterPro: IPR001556
  - Bombesin-like receptor 3 (BRS3)
  - Neuromedin B receptor (NMBR)
  - Gastrin-releasing peptide receptor (GRPR)
- Endothelin receptor InterPro: IPR000499
  - Endothelin receptor type A (EDNRA, ET1R)
  - Endothelin receptor type B (EDNRB, ETBR)
  - GPR37 (GPR37, ETBR-LP2) InterPro: IPR003909
- Neuromedin U receptor InterPro: IPR005390
  - Neuromedin U receptor 1 (NMUR1)
  - Neuromedin U receptor 2 (NMUR2)
- Neurotensin receptor InterPro: IPR003984
  - Neurotensin receptor 1 (NTSR1, NTR1)
  - Neurotensin receptor 2 (NTSR2, NTR2)
- Thyrotropin-releasing hormone receptor (TRHR, TRFR) InterPro: IPR009144
- Growth hormone secretagogue receptor (GHSR) InterPro: IPR003905
- GPR39 (GPR39)
- Motilin receptor (MLNR, GPR38)

=== Subfamily A8 ===
- Anaphylatoxin receptors InterPro: IPR002234
  - C3a receptor (C3AR1, C3AR)
  - C5a receptor (C5AR1, C5AR)
  - Chemokine-like receptor 1 (CMKLR1, CML1) InterPro: IPR002258
- Formyl peptide receptor InterPro: IPR000826
  - Formyl peptide receptor 1 (FPR1, FMLR)
  - Formyl peptide receptor-like 1 (FPRL1, FML2)
  - Formyl peptide receptor-like 2 (FPRL2, FML1)
- MAS1 oncogene InterPro: IPR000820
  - MAS1 (MAS1, MAS)
  - MAS1L (MAS1L, MRG)
- CMKLR2 (GPR1)
- GPR32 (GPR32, GPRW)
- GPR44 (GPR44)
- GPR77 (GPR77, C5L2)

=== Subfamily A9 ===
- Melatonin receptor InterPro: IPR000025
  - Melatonin receptor 1A (MTNR1A, ML1A)
  - Melatonin receptor 1B (MTNR1B, ML1B)
- Neurokinin receptor InterPro: IPR001681
  - Tachykinin receptor 1 (TACR1, NK1R)
  - Tachykinin receptor 2 (TACR2, NK2R)
  - Tachykinin receptor 3 (TACR3, NK3R)
- Neuropeptide Y receptor InterPro: IPR000611
  - Neuropeptide Y receptor Y1 (NPY1R, NY1R)
  - Neuropeptide Y receptor Y2 (NPY2R, NY2R)
  - Pancreatic polypeptide receptor 1 (PPYR1, NY4R)
  - Neuropeptide Y receptor Y5 (NPY5R, NY5R)
- Prolactin-releasing peptide receptor (PRLHR, GPRA) InterPro: IPR001402
- Prokineticin receptor 1 (PROKR1, GPR73)
- Prokineticin receptor 2 (PROKR2, PKR2)
- GPR19 (GPR19, GPRJ)
- GPR50 (GPR50, ML1X)
- GPR75 (GPR75)
- GPR83 (GPR83, GPR72)

=== Subfamily A10 ===
- Glycoprotein hormone receptor InterPro: IPR002131
  - FSH-receptor (FSHR)
  - Luteinizing hormone/choriogonadotropin receptor (LHCGR, LSHR)
  - Thyrotropin receptor (TSHR)
- Leucine-rich repeat-containing G protein-coupled receptor 4 (LGR4, GPR48)
- Leucine-rich repeat-containing G protein-coupled receptor 5 (LGR5, GPR49)
- Leucine-rich repeat-containing G protein-coupled receptor 6 (LGR6)

=== Subfamily A11 ===
- GPR40-related receptor InterPro: IPR013312
  - Free fatty acid receptor 1 (FFAR1, GPR40)
  - Free fatty acid receptor 2 (FFAR2, GPR43)
  - Free fatty acid receptor 3 (FFAR3, GPR41)
  - GPR42 (GPR42, FFAR1L)
- P2 purinoceptor InterPro: IPR002286
  - Purinergic receptor P2Y_{1} (P2RY1)
  - Purinergic receptor P2Y_{2} (P2RY2)
  - Purinergic receptor P2Y_{4} (P2RY4)
  - Purinergic receptor P2Y_{6} (P2RY6)
  - Purinergic receptor P2Y_{8} (P2RY8)
  - Purinergic receptor P2Y_{11} (P2RY11)
- Hydroxycarboxylic acid receptor 1 (HCAR1, GPR81)
- Hydroxycarboxylic acid receptor 2, Niacin receptor 1 (HCAR2, GPR109A)
- Hydroxycarboxylic acid receptor 3, Niacin receptor 2 (HCAR3, GPR109B, HM74)
- GPR31 (GPR31, GPRV)
- GPR82 (GPR82)
- Oxoglutarate (alpha-ketoglutarate) receptor 1 (OXGR1, GPR80)
- Succinate receptor 1 (SUCNR1, GPR91)

=== Subfamily A12 ===
- P2 purinoceptor InterPro: IPR002286
  - Purinergic receptor P2Y_{12} (P2RY12)
  - Purinergic receptor P2Y_{13} (P2RY13, GPR86) InterPro: IPR008109
  - Purinergic receptor P2Y_{14} (P2RY14, UDP-glucose receptor, KI01) InterPro: IPR005466
- GPR34 (GPR34)
- GPR87 (GPR87)
- GPR171 (GPR171, H963)
- Platelet-activating factor receptor (PTAFR, PAFR) InterPro: IPR002282

=== Subfamily A13 ===
- Cannabinoid receptor InterPro: IPR002230
  - Cannabinoid receptor 1 (brain) (CNR1, CB1R)
  - Cannabinoid receptor 2 (macrophage) (CNR2, CB2R)
- Lysophosphatidic acid receptor InterPro: IPR004065
  - Lysophosphatidic acid receptor 1 (LPAR1)
  - Lysophosphatidic acid receptor 2 (LPAR2)
  - Lysophosphatidic acid receptor 3 (LPAR3)
- Sphingosine 1-phosphate receptor InterPro: IPR004061
  - Sphingosine 1-phosphate receptor 1 (S1PR1)
  - Sphingosine 1-phosphate receptor 2 (S1PR2)
  - Sphingosine 1-phosphate receptor 3 (S1PR3)
  - Sphingosine 1-phosphate receptor 4 (S1PR4)
  - Sphingosine 1-phosphate receptor 5 (S1PR5)
- Melanocortin/ACTH receptor InterPro: IPR001671
  - Melanocortin 1 receptor (MC1R, MSHR)
  - Melanocortin 3 receptor (MC3R)
  - Melanocortin 4 receptor (MC4R)
  - Melanocortin 5 receptor (MC5R)
  - ACTH receptor (MC2R), ACTR)
- GPR3 (GPR3)
- GPR6 (GPR6)
- GPR12 (GPR12, GPRC)

=== Subfamily A14 ===
- Eicosanoid receptor InterPro: IPR008365
  - Prostaglandin D_{2} receptor (PTGDR, PD2R)
  - Prostaglandin E_{1} receptor (PTGER1, PE21)
  - Prostaglandin E_{2} receptor (PTGER2, PE22)
  - Prostaglandin E_{3} receptor (PTGER3, PE23)
  - Prostaglandin E_{4} receptor (PTGER4, PE24)
  - Prostaglandin F receptor (PTGFR, PF2R)
  - Prostaglandin I_{2} (prostacyclin) receptor (PTGIR, PI2R)
  - Thromboxane A_{2} receptor (TBXA2R, TA2R)

=== Subfamily A15 ===
- Lysophosphatidic acid receptor InterPro: IPR004065
  - Lysophosphatidic acid receptor 4 (LPAR4)
  - Lysophosphatidic acid receptor 5 (LPAR5)
  - Lysophosphatidic acid receptor 6 (LPAR6) InterPro: IPR002188
- P2 purinoceptor InterPro: IPR002286
  - Purinergic receptor P2Y_{10} (P2RY10, P2Y10)
- Protease-activated receptor InterPro: IPR003912
  - Coagulation factor II (thrombin) receptor-like 1 (F2RL1, PAR2)
  - Coagulation factor II (thrombin) receptor-like 2 (F2RL2, PAR3)
  - Coagulation factor II (thrombin) receptor-like 3 (F2RL3, PAR4)
- Epstein-Barr virus induced gene 2 (lymphocyte-specific G protein-coupled receptor) (GPR183)
- Proton-sensing G protein-coupled receptors
  - GPR4 (GPR4) InterPro: IPR002276
  - GPR65 (GPR65) InterPro: IPR005464
  - GPR68 (GPR68) InterPro: IPR005389
  - GPR132 (GPR132, G2A) InterPro: IPR005388
- GPR17 (GPR17, GPRH)
- GPR18 (GPR18, GPRI)
- GPR20 (GPR20, GPRK)
- GPR35 (GPR35)
- GPR55 (GPR55)
- Coagulation factor II receptor (F2R, THRR)

=== Subfamily A16 ===
- Opsins InterPro: IPR001760
  - Rhodopsin (RHO, OPSD)
  - Opsin 1 (cone pigments), short-wave-sensitive (color blindness, tritan) (OPN1SW, OPSB) (blue-sensitive opsin)
  - Opsin 1 (cone pigments), medium-wave-sensitive (color blindness, deutan) (OPN1MW, OPSG) (green-sensitive opsin)
  - Opsin 1 (cone pigments), long-wave-sensitive (color blindness, protan) (OPN1LW, OPSR) (red-sensitive opsin)
  - Opsin 3, Panopsin (OPN3)
  - Opsin 4, Melanopsin (OPN4)
  - Opsin 5 (OPN5, GPR136)
  - Retinal G protein coupled receptor (RGR)
  - Retinal pigment epithelium-derived rhodopsin homolog (RRH, OPSX) (visual pigment-like receptor opsin) InterPro: IPR001793

=== Subfamily A17 ===
- 5-Hydroxytryptamine (5-HT) receptor InterPro: IPR002231
  - 5-HT_{2A} (HTR2A, 5H2A)
  - 5-HT_{2B} (HTR2B, 5H2B)
  - 5-HT_{2C} (HTR2C, 5H2C)
  - 5-HT_{6} (HTR6, 5H6) InterPro: IPR002232
- Adrenergic receptor InterPro: IPR002233
  - Alpha_{1A} (ADRA1A, A1AA)
  - Alpha_{1B} (ADRA1B, A1AB)
  - Alpha_{1D} (ADRA1D, A1AD)
  - Alpha_{2A} (ADRA2A, A2AA)
  - Alpha_{2B} (ADRA2B, A2AB)
  - Alpha_{2C} (ADRA2C, A2AC)
  - Beta_{1} (ADRB1, B1AR)
  - Beta_{2} (ADRB2, B2AR)
  - Beta_{3} (ADRB3, B3AR)
- Dopamine receptor InterPro: IPR000929
  - D_{1} (DRD1, DADR)
  - D_{2} (DRD2, D2DR)
  - D_{3} (DRD3, D3DR)
  - D_{4} (DRD4, D4DR)
  - D_{5} (DRD5, DBDR)
- Trace amine receptor InterPro: IPR009132
  - TAAR1 (TAAR1, TAR1)
  - TAAR2 (TAAR2, GPR58)
  - TAAR3 (TAAR3, GPR57)
  - TAAR5 (TAAR5, PNR)
  - TAAR6 (TAAR6, TAR4)
  - TAAR8 (TAAR8, GPR102)
  - TAAR9 (TAAR9, TAR3)
- Histamine H_{2} receptor (HRH2, HH2R) InterPro: IPR000503

=== Subfamily A18 ===
- Histamine H_{1} receptor (HRH1, HH1R) InterPro: IPR000921
- Histamine H_{3} receptor (HRH3) InterPro: IPR003980
- Histamine H_{4} receptor (HRH4) InterPro: IPR008102
- Adenosine receptor InterPro: IPR001634
  - A_{1} (ADORA1, AA1R)
  - A_{2a} (ADORA2A, AA2A)
  - A_{2b} (ADORA2B, AA2B)
  - A_{3} (ADORA3, AA3R)
- Muscarinic acetylcholine receptor InterPro: IPR000995
  - M_{1} (CHRM1, ACM1)
  - M_{2} (CHRM2, ACM2)
  - M_{3} (CHRM3, ACM3)
  - M_{4} (CHRM4, ACM4)
  - M_{5} (CHRM5, ACM5)
- GPR21 (GPR21, GPRL)
- GPR27 (GPR27)
- GPR45 (GPR45, PSP24)
- GPR52 (GPR52)
- GPR61 (GPR61)
- GPR62 (GPR62)
- GPR63 (GPR63)
- GPR78 (GPR78)
- GPR84 (GPR84)
- GPR85 (GPR85)
- GPR88 (GPR88)
- GPR101 (GPR101)
- GPR161 (GPR161, RE2)
- GPR173 (GPR173, SREB3)

=== Subfamily A19 ===
- 5-Hydroxytryptamine (5-HT) receptor InterPro: IPR002231
  - 5-HT_{1A} (HTR1A, 5H1A)
  - 5-HT_{1B} (HTR1B, 5H1B)
  - 5-HT_{1D} (HTR1D, 5H1D)
  - 5-HT_{1E} (HTR1E, 5H1E)
  - 5-HT_{1F} (HTR1F, 5H1F)
  - 5-HT_{4} (HTR4) InterPro: IPR001520
  - 5-HT_{5A} (HTR5A, 5H5A)
  - 5-HT_{7} (HTR7, 5H7) InterPro: IPR001069

=== Unclassified ===
- Olfactory receptor InterPro: IPR000725
- Nematode chemoreceptor (multiple, including InterPro: IPR000344InterPro: IPR019424)
- Taste receptor type 2 InterPro: IPR007960
- Vomeronasal receptor type 1 InterPro: IPR004072
  - VN1R1
  - VN1R2
  - VN1R3
  - VN1R4
  - VN1R5
