= Vomeronasal receptor =

Class of olfactory receptors

Vomeronasal receptor, type 1 (V1R/ORA)
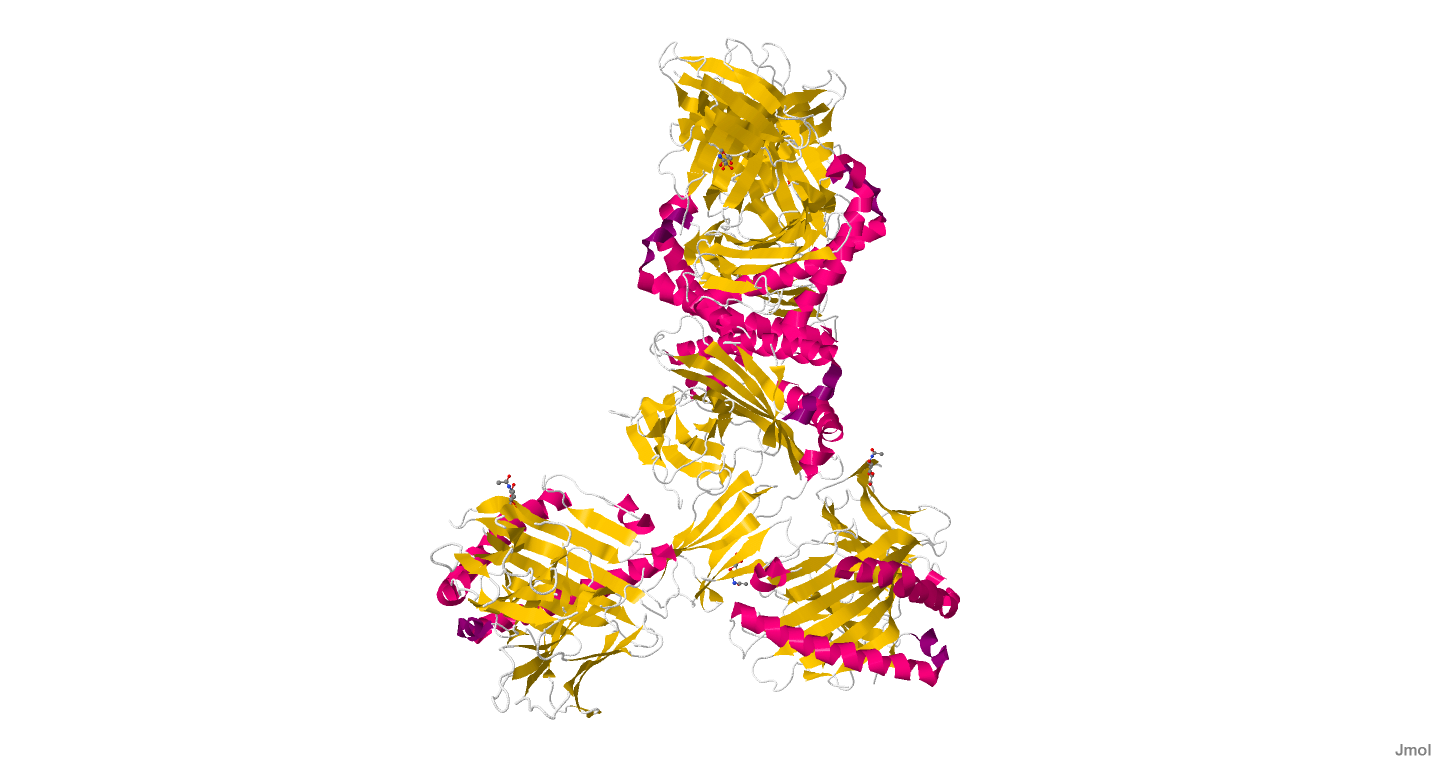

Identifiers
- Symbol: Vmron_rcpt_1
- Pfam: PF03402
- InterPro: IPR004072
Available protein structures:
- PDB: 1ZS8 IPR004072 PF03402 (ECOD; PDBsum)
- AlphaFold: IPR004072; PF03402

GPCR, family 3, vomeronasal receptor, type 2 (V2R/OlfC)

Identifiers
- Symbol: GPCR_3_vmron_rcpt_2
- InterPro: IPR004073
Available protein structures:
- PDB: IPR004073
- AlphaFold: IPR004073

Vomeronasal receptors are a class of olfactory receptors that putatively function as receptors for pheromones. Pheromones have evolved in all animal phyla, to signal sex and dominance status, and are responsible for stereotypical social and sexual behaviour among members of the same species. In mammals, these chemical signals are believed to be detected primarily by the vomeronasal organ (VNO), a chemosensory organ located at the base of the nasal septum.

The VNO is present in most amphibia, reptiles and non-primate mammals but is absent in birds, adult catarrhine monkeys and apes. An active role for the human VNO in the detection of pheromones is disputed; the VNO is clearly present in the fetus but appears to be atrophied or absent in adults. Two distinct families of vomeronasal receptors – which putatively function as pheromone receptors – have been identified in the vomeronasal organ (V1Rs and V2Rs). While all are G protein-coupled receptors (GPCRs), they are distantly related to the receptors of the main olfactory system, highlighting their different role.

Vertebrates have a total of four olfactory receptor families: OR, trace amine-associated receptor (TAAR), V1R/ORA, and V2R/OlfC. This article deals with the latter two.

== V1R ==
The V1 receptors share between 50 and 90% sequence identity but have little similarity to other families of G protein-coupled receptors. They appear to be distantly related to the mammalian T2R bitter taste receptors and the rhodopsin-like GPCRs. In rat, the family comprises 30–40 genes. These are expressed in the apical regions of the VNO, in neurons expressing Gi2. Coupling of the receptors to this protein mediates inositol trisphosphate signaling. A number of human V1 receptor homologues have also been found. The majority of these human sequences are pseudogenes, but an apparently functional receptor has been identified that is expressed in the human olfactory system.

In the field of fish biology, the V1R are also called ORA (olfactory receptor class A): named after the fact that it is a class A GPCR. For an overview of V1R subgroups, see Policarpo et al. (2024), Supplementary Fig. 25. V1R is the sister clade of T2R, the bitter taste receptor.

== V2R ==
The V2 receptors are members of GPCR family 3 and have close similarity to the extracellular calcium-sensing receptors. Rodents appear to have around 100 functional V2 receptors and many pseudogenes. These receptors are expressed in the basal regions of VNO, where they couple to G proteins to mediate inositol trisphosphate responses. Homologues have also been identified in fish, and the ligand specificity of one such receptor has been determined: a receptor from goldfish olfactory epithelium has been reported to bind basic amino acids, which are odorants for fish.

In the field of fish biology, this class is also called OlfC, after the fact that it is a class C (3) GPCR. V2R may be broken down into groups A through D, with many subgroups in C and D – see Policarpo et al. (2024), Supplementary Fig. 25.

== Human proteins containing this domain ==
- V1
  - VN1R1
  - VN1R2
  - VN1R3
  - VN1R5
- V2: None in humans. Vmn2r116 (E9Q6I0) and Vmn2r26 (Q6TAC4) are examples in mice.

== See also ==
- Olfaction
- Trace amine-associated receptor
- Membrane steroid receptor
