= Alamandine =

Pharmacology of a New Angiotensin Peptide

Names
- IUPAC name (2S)-1-[(2S)-2-[[(2S,3S)-2-[[(2S)-2-[[(2S)-2-[[(2S)-2-[[(2S)-2-aminopropanoyl]amino]-5-(diaminomethylideneamino)pentanoyl]amino]-3-methylbutanoyl]amino]-3-(4-hydroxyphenyl)propanoyl]amino]-3-methylpentanoyl]amino]-3-(1H-imidazol-5-yl)propanoyl]pyrrolidine-2-carboxylic acid
- Other names H-Ala-Arg-Val-Tyr-Ile-His-Pro-OH; L-alanyl-L-arginyl-L-valyl-L-tyrosyl-L-isoleucyl-L-histidyl-L-proline

Identifiers
CAS Number	1176306-10-7
3D model (JSmol)	Interactive image
Abbreviations	ARVYIHP
ChEBI	CHEBI:190281
ChemSpider	62956427
KEGG	C20971
PubChem CID	44192273
- InChI: InChI=1S/C40H62N12O9/c1-6-22(4)32(37(58)49-29(18-25-19-44-20-46-25)38(59)52-16-8-10-30(52)39(60)61)51-35(56)28(17-24-11-13-26(53)14-12-24)48-36(57)31(21(2)3)50-34(55)27(47-33(54)23(5)41)9-7-15-45-40(42)43/h11-14,19-23,27-32,53H,6-10,15-18,41H2,1-5H3,(H,44,46)(H,47,54)(H,48,57)(H,49,58)(H,50,55)(H,51,56)(H,60,61)(H4,42,43,45)/t22-,23-,27-,28-,29-,30-,31-,32-/m0/s1 Key: QVMYBFKDLPBYSO-GIGALADGSA-N
- SMILES: CC[C@H](C)[C@@H](C(=O)N[C@@H](CC1=CN=CN1)C(=O)N2CCC[C@H]2C(=O)O)NC(=O)[C@H](CC3=CC=C(C=C3)O)NC(=O)[C@H](C(C)C)NC(=O)[C@H](CCCN=C(N)N)NC(=O)[C@H](C)N

Properties
Chemical formula	C_{40}H_{62}N_{12}O_{9}
Molar mass	855 g/mol
- Except where otherwise noted, data are given for materials in their standard state (at 25 °C [77 °F], 100 kPa). Infobox references

Alamandine is a member of renin-angiotensin system (RAS) with cardiovascular functions that are protective and opposing to the classical axis. Alamandine is a product of ACE2-dependent catalytic hydrolysis of angiotensin A (Ang A) and can also be generated by decarboxylation of aspartic acid residue of Ang-(1-7). Ang A is Ala1-Ang II (alanine in place of aspartic acid). In mononuclear leucocytes, angiotensin II (Ang II) is converted to Ang A by decarboxylation of aspartic acid. Ang A is detected in human circulation and was shown to be higher in individuals with end-stage renal disease.

== Receptor ==
Mice deficient of MrgD receptor showed myocardial pathology with dilated cardiomyopathy and a marked decrease in systolic function further supporting cardioprotective pharmacology of alamandine.

== Vascular actions ==
Alamandine produced endothelium-dependent vasorelaxation that was blocked by D-Pro7-Ang-(1-7), an MrgD receptor antagonist but not by A779, an antagonist of Mas receptor. In agreement with this, Tetzner et al showed that alamandine activated cAMP formation in endothelial and mesangial cells transfected with MrgD. Importantly, oral administration of an alamandine/2-hydroxypropyl β-cyclodextrin (HPβCD) complex produced an antihypertensive effect in spontaneously hypertensive rats (SHR). In the same model, vascular remodeling in the ascending aorta was also prevented that was associated with decreased pro-inflammatory (IL-1β, TNF alpha and CCL2) and pro-fibrotic factors (MMP2 and TGF β1), and increased pro-resolution markers (MRC1 and FIZZ1)

== Cardiac actions ==
Almandine showed cardioprotective effects in experimental models of pressure overload. In mice undergoing transverse aortic constriction, Alamandine prevented cardiac hypertrophy and fibrosis that was shown to be mediated partly via decreased ERK1/2 phosphorylation, TGF β1 and MMP2, and increased AMPKα phosphorylation.

== Central effects ==
Experimental evidence was provided for an important role of this peptide in the central regulation of blood pressure. A study by Marins et al showed evidence for central regulation of hemodynamics specifically by acting on MrgD receptors in rostral insular cortex. Microinjection of alamandine in this area elevated mean arterial blood pressure and renal sympathetic activity that were blocked by D-Pro7-Ang-(1-7), an MrgD antagonist.
