= VNR =

VNR could stand for:

- Hungarian People's Republic, Russian transliteration of Vengerskaya Narodnaya Respublika (satellite state of the Soviet Union)
- People's National Reich Association, the political wing of the Young German Order
- Vale of Neath Railway
- Video news release
- Vietnam Railways
- Vomeronasal receptor, GPCR receptor
