= MRGPRX3 =

Protein-coding gene in the species Homo sapiens

Identifiers
- Aliases: MRGPRX3, GPCR, MRGX3, SNSR1, SNSR2, MAS related GPR family member X3
- External IDs: OMIM: 607229; MGI: 3033148; GeneCards: MRGPRX3

Gene location (Human)
Chr.	Chromosome 11 (human)
Band	11p15.1	Start	18,120,955 bp
Band	11p15.1	End	18,138,488 bp

Gene location (Mouse)
Chr.	Chromosome 7 (mouse)
Band	7|7 B3	Start	46,884,609 bp
Band	7|7 B3	End	46,902,596 bp
RNA expression pattern
Bgee	Human / Mouse (ortholog); Top expressed in: minor salivary glands; olfactory zone of nasal mucosa; lactiferous gland; urinary bladder; vagina; ectocervix; skin of leg; smooth muscle tissue; tibial nerve / n/a; More reference expression data
BioGPS	n/a
Gene ontology
Molecular function	signal transducer activity; G protein-coupled receptor activity
Cellular component	plasma membrane; membrane; integral component of membrane; integral component of plasma membrane
Biological process	G protein-coupled receptor signaling pathway; signal transduction
Sources:Amigo / QuickGO
Orthologs
Databases	NCBI: entry; OMA: entry
Species	Human	Mouse
Entrez	117195	668725
Ensembl	ENSG00000179826	ENSMUSG00000074111
UniProt	Q96LB0	n/a
RefSeq (mRNA)	NM_054031; NM_001370464	NM_001177566; NM_001288801
RefSeq (protein)	NP_473372; NP_001357393	n/a
Location (UCSC)	Chr 11: 18.12 – 18.14 Mb	Chr 7: 46.88 – 46.9 Mb
PubMed search
- Wikidata
View/Edit Human	View/Edit Mouse

Mas-related G-protein coupled receptor member X3 is a protein that in humans is encoded by the MRGPRX3 gene.

== See also ==
- MAS1 oncogene
