= GPR141 =

Protein-coding gene in the species Homo sapiens

Identifiers
- Aliases: GPR141, PGR13, G protein-coupled receptor 141
- External IDs: OMIM: 609045; MGI: 2672983; GeneCards: GPR141

Gene location (Human)
Chr.	Chromosome 7 (human)
Band	7p14.1	Start	37,683,766 bp
Band	7p14.1	End	37,833,788 bp

Gene location (Mouse)
Chr.	Chromosome 13 (mouse)
Band	13|13 A2	Start	19,933,852 bp
Band	13|13 A2	End	20,008,427 bp
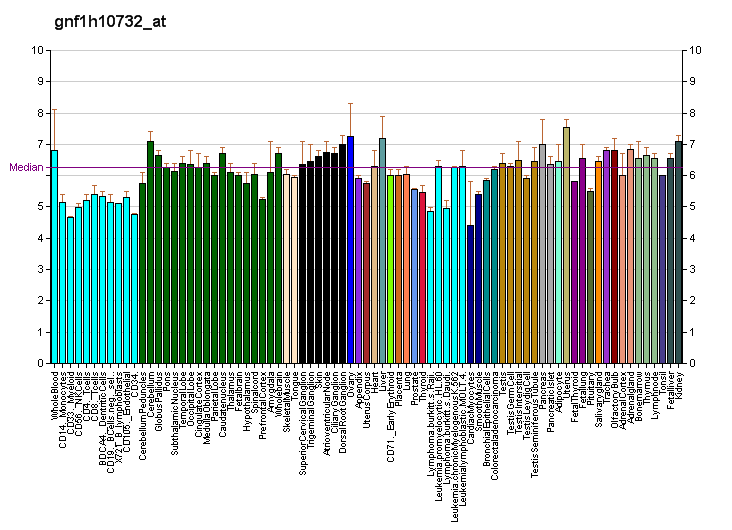
RNA expression pattern
Bgee	Human / Mouse (ortholog); Top expressed in: monocyte; bone marrow; blood; bone marrow cell; testicle; granulocyte; appendix; gonad; gallbladder; spleen / Top expressed in: granulocyte; embryo; ovary; bone marrow; spleen; zone of skin; ileum; jejunum; placenta; lung; More reference expression data
BioGPS	More reference expression data
Gene ontology
Molecular function	signal transducer activity; G protein-coupled receptor activity
Cellular component	membrane; integral component of membrane; plasma membrane
Biological process	signal transduction; G protein-coupled receptor signaling pathway
Sources:Amigo / QuickGO
Orthologs
Databases	NCBI: entry; OMA: entry
Species	Human	Mouse
Entrez	353345	353346
Ensembl	ENSG00000187037	ENSMUSG00000053101
UniProt	Q7Z602	Q7TQP0
RefSeq (mRNA)	NM_181791; NM_001329993; NM_001329994; NM_001381946	NM_181754
RefSeq (protein)	NP_001316922; NP_001316923; NP_861456; NP_001368875	NP_861419
Location (UCSC)	Chr 7: 37.68 – 37.83 Mb	Chr 13: 19.93 – 20.01 Mb
PubMed search
- Wikidata
View/Edit Human	View/Edit Mouse

Probable G-protein coupled receptor 141 is a protein that in humans is encoded by the GPR141 gene.

GPR141 is a member of the rhodopsin family of G protein-coupled receptors (GPRs).
