= MRGPRE =

Protein-coding gene in humans

Identifiers
- Aliases: MRGPRE, GPR167, MGRF, MRGE, MAS related GPR family member E
- External IDs: OMIM: 607232; MGI: 2441884; GeneCards: MRGPRE

Gene location (Human)
Chr.	Chromosome 11 (human)
Band	11p15.4	Start	3,225,030 bp
Band	11p15.4	End	3,232,417 bp

Gene location (Mouse)
Chr.	Chromosome 7 (mouse)
Band	7|7 F5	Start	143,332,100 bp
Band	7|7 F5	End	143,338,237 bp
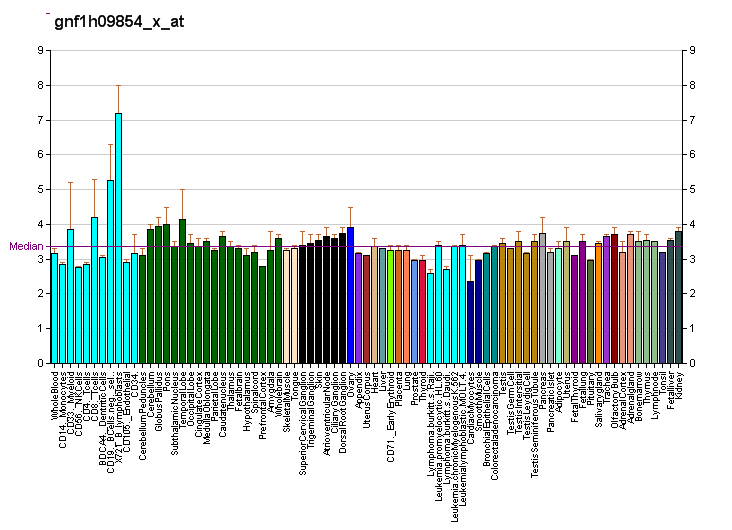
RNA expression pattern
Bgee	Human / Mouse (ortholog); Top expressed in: spinal ganglia; trigeminal ganglion; pons; islet of Langerhans; superior vestibular nucleus; pars compacta; decidua; canal of the cervix; apex of heart; inferior ganglion of vagus nerve / Top expressed in: lumbar spinal ganglion; autonomic nervous system; sympathetic ganglion; epithelium of lens; paravertebral ganglia; dentate gyrus of hippocampal formation granule cell; cervical ganglion; stroma of bone marrow; islet of Langerhans; supraoptic nucleus; More reference expression data
BioGPS	More reference expression data
Gene ontology
Molecular function	signal transducer activity; G protein-coupled receptor activity
Cellular component	integral component of membrane; plasma membrane; membrane; integral component of plasma membrane
Biological process	G protein-coupled receptor signaling pathway; signal transduction
Sources:Amigo / QuickGO
Orthologs
Databases	NCBI: entry; OMA: entry
Species	Human	Mouse
Entrez	116534	244238
Ensembl	ENSG00000184350	ENSMUSG00000048965
UniProt	Q86SM8	Q91ZB7
RefSeq (mRNA)	NM_001039165	NM_175534
RefSeq (protein)	NP_001034254	NP_780743
Location (UCSC)	Chr 11: 3.23 – 3.23 Mb	Chr 7: 143.33 – 143.34 Mb
PubMed search
- Wikidata
View/Edit Human	View/Edit Mouse

Mas-related G-protein coupled receptor member E is a protein that in humans is encoded by the MRGPRE gene.

== See also ==
- MAS1 oncogene
