= MRGPRF =

Protein-coding gene in the species Homo sapiens

Identifiers
- Aliases: MRGPRF, GPR140, GPR168, MRGF, RTA, MAS related GPR family member F
- External IDs: OMIM: 607233; MGI: 2384823; GeneCards: MRGPRF

Gene location (Human)
Chr.	Chromosome 11 (human)
Band	11q13.3	Start	69,004,395 bp
Band	11q13.3	End	69,013,382 bp

Gene location (Mouse)
Chr.	Chromosome 7 (mouse)
Band	7|7 F5	Start	144,854,565 bp
Band	7|7 F5	End	144,863,294 bp
RNA expression pattern
Bgee	Human / Mouse (ortholog); Top expressed in: gastric mucosa; left uterine tube; saphenous vein; body of uterus; urethra; myometrium; muscle layer of sigmoid colon; tail of epididymis; canal of the cervix; nipple / Top expressed in: calvaria; ankle; esophagus; gastrula; lip; cervix; cerebellar cortex; optic nerve; aorta; trachea; More reference expression data
BioGPS	n/a
Gene ontology
Molecular function	signal transducer activity; G protein-coupled receptor activity
Cellular component	integral component of membrane; plasma membrane; nuclear membrane; membrane; integral component of plasma membrane
Biological process	G protein-coupled receptor signaling pathway; signal transduction
Sources:Amigo / QuickGO
Orthologs
Databases	NCBI: entry; OMA: entry
Species	Human	Mouse
Entrez	116535	211577
Ensembl	ENSG00000172935	ENSMUSG00000031070
UniProt	Q96AM1	Q8VCJ6
RefSeq (mRNA)	NM_145015; NM_001098515	NM_145379
RefSeq (protein)	NP_001091985; NP_659452	NP_663354
Location (UCSC)	Chr 11: 69 – 69.01 Mb	Chr 7: 144.85 – 144.86 Mb
PubMed search
- Wikidata
View/Edit Human	View/Edit Mouse

MAS-related GPR, member F, also known as MRGPRF, is a human gene.

== See also ==
- MAS1 oncogene
