= CMKLR2 =

Protein-coding gene in humans

Identifiers
- Aliases: CMKLR2, G protein-coupled receptor 1, chemerin chemokine-like receptor 2, GPR1
- External IDs: OMIM: 600239; MGI: 2385324; GeneCards: CMKLR2

Gene location (Human)
Chr.	Chromosome 2 (human)
Band	2q33.3	Start	206,175,316 bp
Band	2q33.3	End	206,218,047 bp

Gene location (Mouse)
Chr.	Chromosome 1 (mouse)
Band	1|1 C2	Start	63,221,850 bp
Band	1|1 C2	End	63,253,702 bp
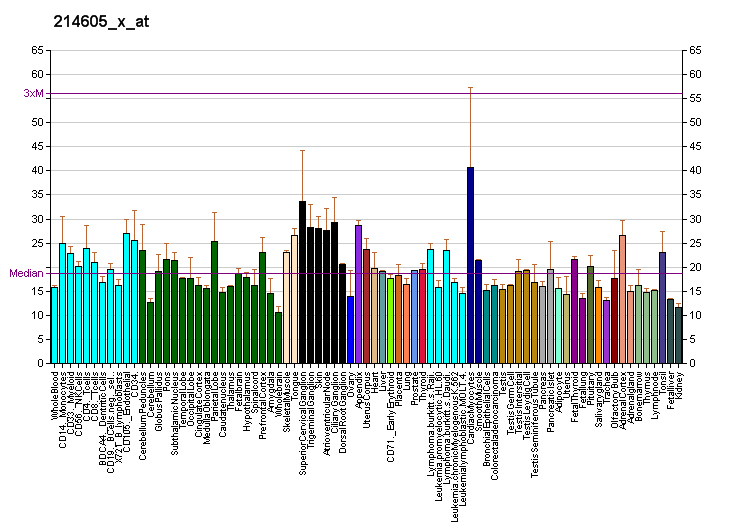
RNA expression pattern
Bgee	Human / Mouse (ortholog); Top expressed in: placenta; stromal cell of endometrium; testicle; mucosa of esophagus; skin of leg; right adrenal cortex; ventricular zone; left adrenal gland; gallbladder; left adrenal cortex / Top expressed in: primary oocyte; secondary oocyte; zygote; placenta; urethra; female urethra; decidua; male urethra; epithelium of urethra; epithelium of male urethra; More reference expression data
BioGPS	More reference expression data
Gene ontology
Molecular function	neuropeptide binding; signal transducer activity; protein binding; G protein-coupled receptor activity; peptide binding
Cellular component	membrane; integral component of membrane; integral component of plasma membrane; neuron projection; plasma membrane; intracellular membrane-bounded organelle; nucleoplasm
Biological process	chemical synaptic transmission; neuropeptide signaling pathway; G protein-coupled receptor signaling pathway; signal transduction; G protein-coupled receptor signaling pathway, coupled to cyclic nucleotide second messenger
Sources:Amigo / QuickGO
Orthologs
Databases	NCBI: entry; OMA: entry
Species	Human	Mouse
Entrez	2825	241070
Ensembl	ENSG00000183671; ENSG00000283448	ENSMUSG00000046856
UniProt	P46091	Q8K087
RefSeq (mRNA)	NM_001098199; NM_001261452; NM_001261453; NM_001261454; NM_001261455 NM_005279; NM_001389445	NM_146250; NM_001357045
RefSeq (protein)	NP_001091669; NP_001248381; NP_001248382; NP_001248383; NP_001248384 NP_005270	NP_666362; NP_001343974
Location (UCSC)	Chr 2: 206.18 – 206.22 Mb	Chr 1: 63.22 – 63.25 Mb
PubMed search
- Wikidata
View/Edit Human	View/Edit Mouse

Chemerin-like receptor 2, is a protein that in humans is encoded by the CMKLR2 gene.

CMKLR2 is a rhodopsin-like receptor and therefore a member of the G protein-coupled receptor family of transmembrane receptors. It functions as a receptor for chemerin. Other receptors for chemerin include CMKLR1 and CCRL2.
