= RTI-122 =

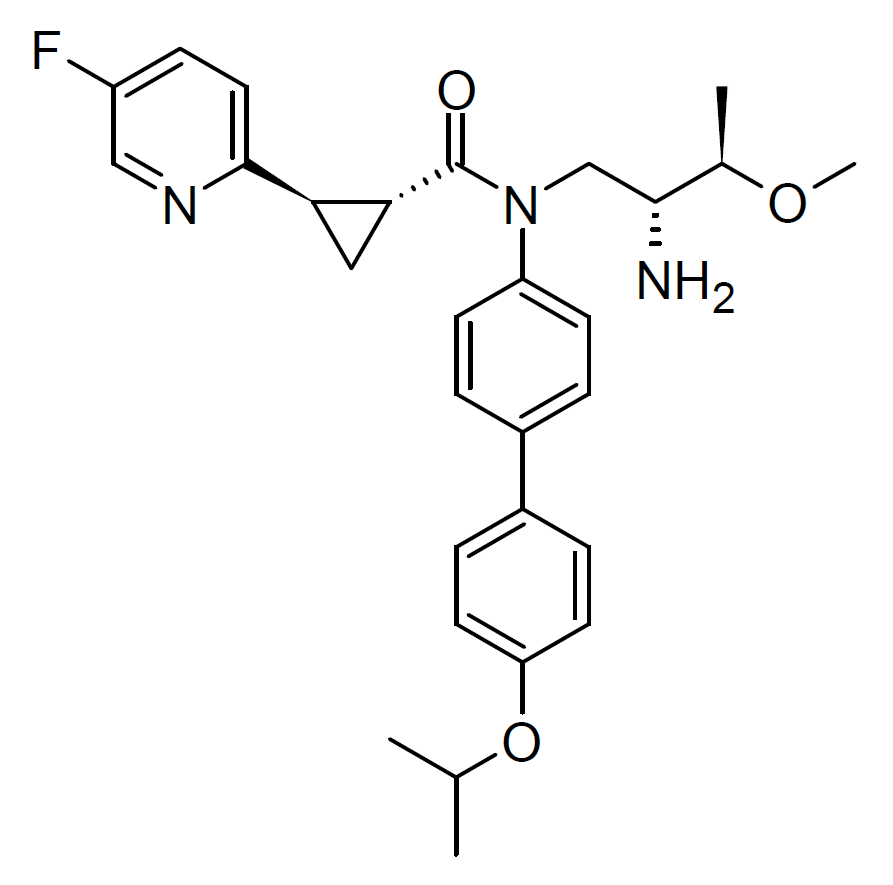

Identifiers
- IUPAC name: (1R,2R)-N-[(2R,3R)-2-amino-3-methoxybutyl]-2-(5-fluoropyridin-2-yl)-N-[4-(4-propan-2-yloxyphenyl)phenyl]cyclopropane-1-carboxamide
- CAS Number: 3034664-39-3
- PubChem CID: 167993640
- ChemSpider: 129307012
- ChEMBL: ChEMBL5498825

Chemical and physical data
- Formula: C_{29}H_{34}FN_{3}O_{3}
- Molar mass: 491.607 g·mol^{−1}
- 3D model (JSmol): Interactive image
- SMILES: C[C@H]([C@@H](CN(C1=CC=C(C=C1)C2=CC=C(C=C2)OC(C)C)C(=O)[C@@H]3C[C@H]3C4=NC=C(C=C4)F)N)OC
- InChI: InChI=1S/C29H34FN3O3/c1-18(2)36-24-12-7-21(8-13-24)20-5-10-23(11-6-20)33(17-27(31)19(3)35-4)29(34)26-15-25(26)28-14-9-22(30)16-32-28/h5-14,16,18-19,25-27H,15,17,31H2,1-4H3/t19-,25-,26-,27-/m1/s1; Key:OXODNABCLPQQDT-CEWWTIOHSA-N

RTI-122 is an experimental drug which acts as a selective agonist for the receptor GPR88, with improved stability and brain penetration compared to older ligands. This receptor is poorly characterised and the development of selective ligands is important for researching its function in the body. In tests on rats, RTI-122 was found to reduce alcohol consumption, suggesting a role for GPR88 in the reward system.
