= CXCL17 =

Cytokine

Identifiers
- Aliases: CXCL17, DMC, Dcip1, UNQ473, VCC-1, VCC1, C-X-C motif chemokine ligand 17
- External IDs: OMIM: 611387; MGI: 2387642; GeneCards: CXCL17

Gene location (Human)
Chr.	Chromosome 19 (human)
Band	19q13.2	Start	42,428,278 bp
Band	19q13.2	End	42,442,946 bp

Gene location (Mouse)
Chr.	Chromosome 7 (mouse)
Band	7|7 A3	Start	25,099,478 bp
Band	7|7 A3	End	25,112,311 bp
RNA expression pattern
Bgee	Human / Mouse (ortholog); Top expressed in: nasal epithelium; olfactory zone of nasal mucosa; bronchial epithelial cell; palpebral conjunctiva; trachea; mucosa of paranasal sinus; minor salivary glands; pylorus; lower lobe of lung; cardia / Top expressed in: submandibular gland; epithelium of stomach; pyloric antrum; mucous cell of stomach; parotid gland; cervix; olfactory epithelium; trachea; right lung lobe; lacrimal gland; More reference expression data
BioGPS	n/a
Gene ontology
Molecular function	protein binding
Cellular component	extracellular region; extracellular space
Biological process	angiogenesis; cell differentiation; multicellular organism development; chemotaxis; positive regulation of vascular endothelial growth factor production; positive regulation of macrophage chemotaxis; negative regulation of inflammatory response; positive regulation of monocyte chemotaxis; macrophage chemotaxis
Sources:Amigo / QuickGO
Orthologs
Databases	NCBI: entry; OMA: entry
Species	Human	Mouse
Entrez	284340	232983
Ensembl	ENSG00000189377	ENSMUSG00000060188
UniProt	Q6UXB2	Q5UW37
RefSeq (mRNA)	NM_198477	NM_153576
RefSeq (protein)	NP_940879	NP_705804
Location (UCSC)	Chr 19: 42.43 – 42.44 Mb	Chr 7: 25.1 – 25.11 Mb
PubMed search
- Wikidata
View/Edit Human	View/Edit Mouse

Chemokine (C-X-C motif) ligand 17 (CXCL17) is a small cytokine initially thought to belong to the CXC chemokine family, then addressed as chemokine-like protein, that has been identified in humans and mice.

CXCL17 has been previously reported to attract dendritic cells and monocytes, but there are also studies not reporting this activity; it is also regulated in tumors. It was formerly known as VEGF co-regulated chemokine 1 (VCC-1) and dendritic cell- and monocyte-attracting chemokine-like protein (DMC). This chemokine is constitutively expressed in the respiratory tract and more specifically in the lung. The gene for human CXCL17 is located on chromosome 19. Human and murine CXCL17 protein share 71% of amino acid sequence identity.

Doubt has been expressed that CXCL17 should truly be considered a member of the chemokine ligand family and it has therefore been described as a "Black Sheep".

== Function ==
Being expressed in the respiratory tract mucosa, CXCL17 is likely to exert functions related to both immune surveillance of the tissue by fostering immune activation and immune suppression in case of overactivation of the immune system against harmless environmental antigens that can be commonly inhaled. CXCL17 also shows some anti-microbial activity against some bacteria, such as E.coli, S. aureus, Salmonella, P. aeruginosa and C. albicans strains.

== Receptor ==
The receptor for CXCL17 is a G protein-coupled receptor (GPCR). The GPCR GPR35 was thought to be a receptor of CXCL17 Subsequent research has suggested that GPR35 is not a receptor for CXCL17. Indeed, recently GPR25 has been uniquely identified as CXCL17 receptor
