= MRGPRD =

Protein-coding gene in the species Homo sapiens

Identifiers
- Aliases: MRGPRD, MRGD, TGR7, MAS related GPR family member D
- External IDs: OMIM: 607231; MGI: 3033142; GeneCards: MRGPRD

Gene location (Human)
Chr.	Chromosome 11 (human)
Band	11q13.3	Start	68,980,021 bp
Band	11q13.3	End	68,980,986 bp

Gene location (Mouse)
Chr.	Chromosome 7 (mouse)
Band	7|7 F5	Start	144,868,572 bp
Band	7|7 F5	End	144,877,823 bp
RNA expression pattern
Bgee	Human / Mouse (ortholog); Top expressed in: testicle; gastric mucosa; muscle layer of sigmoid colon; left uterine tube; popliteal artery; tibial arteries; right coronary artery; cerebellum; smooth muscle tissue; cerebellar cortex / Top expressed in: spinal cord; pons; Gray matter of spinal cord; anterior horn of spinal cord; basal plate; diencephalon; hypothalamus; More reference expression data
BioGPS	n/a
Gene ontology
Molecular function	signal transducer activity; G protein-coupled receptor activity
Cellular component	integral component of membrane; plasma membrane; membrane; extracellular space; integral component of plasma membrane
Biological process	G protein-coupled receptor signaling pathway; signal transduction
Sources:Amigo / QuickGO
Orthologs
Databases	NCBI: entry; OMA: entry
Species	Human	Mouse
Entrez	116512	211578
Ensembl	ENSG00000172938	ENSMUSG00000051207
UniProt	Q8TDS7	Q91ZB8
RefSeq (mRNA)	NM_198923	NM_203490
RefSeq (protein)	NP_944605	NP_987075
Location (UCSC)	Chr 11: 68.98 – 68.98 Mb	Chr 7: 144.87 – 144.88 Mb
PubMed search
- Wikidata
View/Edit Human	View/Edit Mouse

Mas-related G-protein coupled receptor member D is a protein that in humans is encoded by the MRGPRD gene.

== See also ==
- MAS1 oncogene
