= Nematode chemoreceptor =

Nematode chemoreceptor, Sra

Identifiers
- Symbol: Sra_chemorcpt
- Pfam: PF02117
- InterPro: IPR000344
Available protein structures:
- PDB: IPR000344 PF02117 (ECOD; PDBsum)
- AlphaFold: IPR000344; PF02117

Nematode chemoreceptors are chemoreceptors of nematodes. Animals recognise a wide variety of chemicals using their senses of taste and smell. The nematode Caenorhabditis elegans has only 14 types of chemosensory neuron, yet is able to respond to dozens of chemicals because each neuron detects several stimuli. More than 40 highly divergent transmembrane proteins that could contribute to this functional diversity have been described. Most of the candidate receptor genes are in clusters of similar genes; 11 of these appear to be expressed in small subsets of chemosensory neurons. A single type of neuron can potentially express at least 4 different receptor genes. Some of these might encode receptors for water-soluble attractants, repellents and pheromones, which are divergent members of the G-protein-coupled receptor family. Sequences of the Sra family of C. elegans receptor-like proteins contain 6-7 hydrophobic, putative transmembrane, regions. These can be distinguished from other 7TM proteins (especially those known to couple G-proteins) by their own characteristic TM signatures.

More than 1300 potential chemoreceptor genes have been identified in C. elegans, which are generally prefixed sr for serpentine receptor. The receptor superfamilies include Sra (Sra, Srb, Srab, Sre), Str (Srh, Str, Sri, Srd, Srj, Srm, Srn) and Srg (Srx, Srt, Srg, Sru, Srv, Srxa), as well as the families Srw, Srz, Srbc, Srsx and Srr. Many of these proteins have homologues in Caenorhabditis briggsae.

These receptors are distantly related to the rhodopsin-like receptors. In contrast the receptor Sro is a true rhodopsin-like receptor. It is a member of the nemopsins a subgroup of the opsins, but unlike most other opsins it does not have a lysine corresponding to position 296 in cattle rhodopsin. The lysine is replaced by an asparagine. The lysine is needed so that the chromophore retinal can covalently bind to the opsin via a Schiff-base, which makes the opsin light sensitive. If the lysine is replaced by another amino acid then the opsin becomes light insensitive. Therefore, Sro is also thought to be a chemoreceptor.
