= GPR25 =

Protein-coding gene in humans

Identifiers
- Aliases: GPR25, G protein-coupled receptor 25
- External IDs: OMIM: 602174; MGI: 2686146; GeneCards: GPR25

Gene location (Human)
Chr.	Chromosome 1 (human)
Band	1q32.1	Start	200,872,981 bp
Band	1q32.1	End	200,874,178 bp

Gene location (Mouse)
Chr.	Chromosome 1 (mouse)
Band	1|1 E4	Start	136,187,535 bp
Band	1|1 E4	End	136,188,611 bp
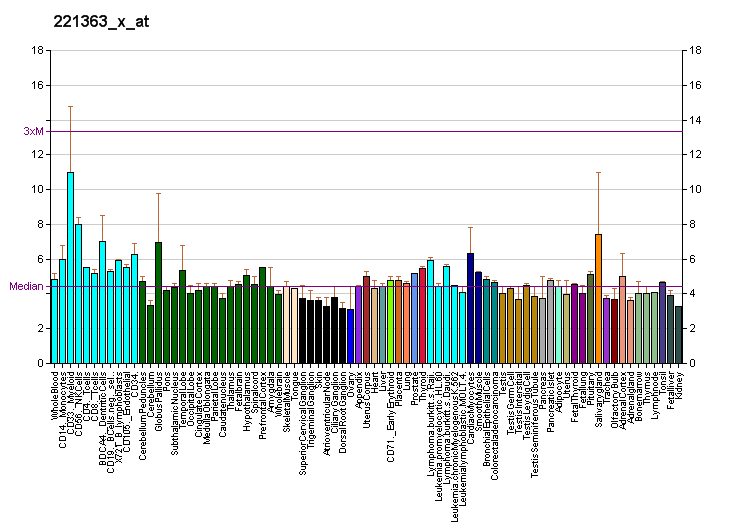
RNA expression pattern
Bgee	Human / Mouse (ortholog); Top expressed in: gonad; granulocyte; blood; appendix; right uterine tube; body of stomach; spleen; fundus; upper lobe of left lung; face / Top expressed in: prefrontal cortex; nucleus accumbens; visual cortex; subiculum; hippocampus proper; primary visual cortex; temporal lobe; piriform cortex; cerebellum; stria vascularis; More reference expression data
BioGPS	More reference expression data
Gene ontology
Molecular function	G protein-coupled receptor activity; protein binding; signal transducer activity
Cellular component	integral component of membrane; plasma membrane; integral component of plasma membrane; membrane
Biological process	G protein-coupled receptor signaling pathway; signal transduction
Sources:Amigo / QuickGO
Orthologs
Databases	NCBI: entry; OMA: entry
Species	Human	Mouse
Entrez	2848	383563
Ensembl	ENSG00000170128	ENSMUSG00000052759
UniProt	O00155	P0C5I1
RefSeq (mRNA)	NM_005298	NM_001101516
RefSeq (protein)	NP_005289	NP_001094986
Location (UCSC)	Chr 1: 200.87 – 200.87 Mb	Chr 1: 136.19 – 136.19 Mb
PubMed search
- Wikidata
View/Edit Human	View/Edit Mouse

C-X-C chemokine receptor GPR25 is a protein that in humans is encoded by the GPR25 gene.

== Structure ==
It is a member of the G protein-coupled receptor (GPCR) family and is well conserved in vertebrate evolution containing a canonical DRYLAVV motif in the third transmembrane sequence. It has a conserved negatively charged N-terminal extracellular peptide comprising a DY candidate sulfation site that is characteristic of many leukocyte chemoattractant receptors for positively charged polypeptides of the chemokine family.

== Tissue distribution ==
GPR25 expression is largely restricted to lymphocytes and natural killer (NK) cells.

== Function ==
It has been identified as the receptor for the chemokine-like protein CXCL17.
