= GPR87 =

Protein-coding gene in the species Homo sapiens

Identifiers
- Aliases: GPR87, GPR95, KPG_002, FKSG78, G protein-coupled receptor 87
- External IDs: OMIM: 606379; MGI: 1934133; GeneCards: GPR87

Gene location (Human)
Chr.	Chromosome 3 (human)
Band	3q25.1	Start	151,294,086 bp
Band	3q25.1	End	151,316,820 bp

Gene location (Mouse)
Chr.	Chromosome 3 (mouse)
Band	3|3 D	Start	59,086,344 bp
Band	3|3 D	End	59,102,525 bp
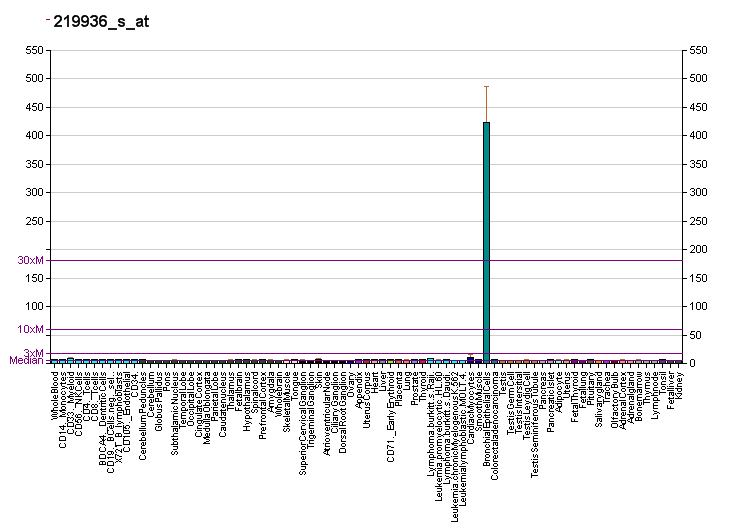
RNA expression pattern
Bgee	Human / Mouse (ortholog); Top expressed in: hair follicle; skin of arm; gingival epithelium; oral cavity; skin of thigh; skin of abdomen; cervix epithelium; vulva; amniotic fluid; epithelium of nasopharynx / Top expressed in: esophagus; hair follicle; skin of external ear; skin of back; cornea; skin of abdomen; lip; conjunctival fornix; transitional epithelium of urinary bladder; condyle; More reference expression data
BioGPS	More reference expression data
Gene ontology
Molecular function	G protein-coupled purinergic nucleotide receptor activity; G protein-coupled receptor activity; signal transducer activity
Cellular component	integral component of membrane; plasma membrane; integral component of plasma membrane; membrane
Biological process	G protein-coupled receptor signaling pathway; negative regulation of adenylate cyclase activity; signal transduction; G protein-coupled purinergic nucleotide receptor signaling pathway; biological process
Sources:Amigo / QuickGO
Orthologs
Databases	NCBI: entry; OMA: entry
Species	Human	Mouse
Entrez	53836	84111
Ensembl	ENSG00000138271	ENSMUSG00000051431
UniProt	Q9BY21	Q99MT7
RefSeq (mRNA)	NM_023915	NM_001302203; NM_032399
RefSeq (protein)	NP_076404	NP_001289132
Location (UCSC)	Chr 3: 151.29 – 151.32 Mb	Chr 3: 59.09 – 59.1 Mb
PubMed search
- Wikidata
View/Edit Human	View/Edit Mouse

Probable G-protein coupled receptor 87 is a protein that in humans is encoded by the GPR87 gene.

G protein-coupled receptors play a role in cell communication. They are characterized by an extracellular N terminus, 7 transmembrane regions, and an intracellular C terminus.[supplied by OMIM]
