= GPR62 =

Protein-coding gene in the species Homo sapiens

Identifiers
- Aliases: GPR62, GPCR8, KPG_005, G protein-coupled receptor 62
- External IDs: OMIM: 606917; MGI: 3525078; GeneCards: GPR62

Gene location (Human)
| Chr. | Chromosome 3 (human) |
| Band | 3p21.2 | Start | 51,955,381 bp |
| Band | 3p21.2 | End | 51,957,499 bp |

Gene location (Mouse)
| Chr. | Chromosome 9 (mouse) |
| Band | 9|9 F1 | Start | 106,341,161 bp |
| Band | 9|9 F1 | End | 106,343,137 bp |
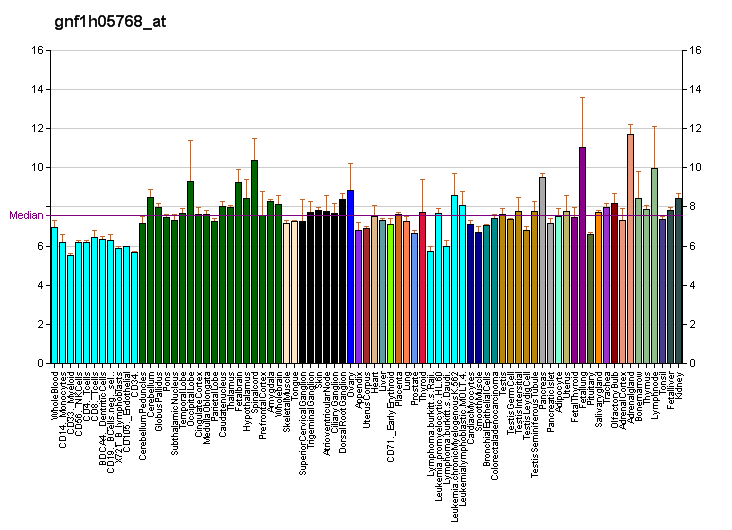
RNA expression pattern
| Bgee | Human / Mouse (ortholog); Top expressed in: inferior ganglion of vagus nerve; C1 segment; internal globus pallidus; subthalamic nucleus; endothelial cell; ventral tegmental area; corpus callosum; substantia nigra; external globus pallidus; medulla oblongata / Top expressed in: lumbar subsegment of spinal cord; seminiferous tubule; deep cerebellar nuclei; substantia nigra; anterior horn of spinal cord; suprachiasmatic nucleus; pontine nuclei; lateral geniculate nucleus; spermatocyte; ventral tegmental area; More reference expression data |
| BioGPS | More reference expression data |
Gene ontology
| Molecular function | G protein-coupled receptor activity; signal transducer activity; protein binding; identical protein binding; arrestin family protein binding |
| Cellular component | integral component of membrane; receptor complex; membrane; plasma membrane; endosome; endosome membrane |
| Biological process | signal transduction; G protein-coupled receptor signaling pathway; positive regulation of cAMP-mediated signaling; inositol phosphate-mediated signaling |
Sources:Amigo / QuickGO
Orthologs
| Databases | NCBI: entry; OMA: entry |
| Species | Human | Mouse |
| Entrez | 118442 | 436090 |
| Ensembl | ENSG00000180929 | ENSMUSG00000091735 |
| UniProt | Q9BZJ7 | Q80UC6 |
| RefSeq (mRNA) | NM_080865 | NM_001159652 |
| RefSeq (protein) | NP_543141 | NP_001153124 |
| Location (UCSC) | Chr 3: 51.96 – 51.96 Mb | Chr 9: 106.34 – 106.34 Mb |
| PubMed search |
- Wikidata
| View/Edit Human | View/Edit Mouse |

Probable G-protein coupled receptor 62 is a protein that in humans is encoded by the GPR62 gene.

G protein–coupled receptors (GPCRs, or GPRs) contain 7 transmembrane domains and transduce extracellular signals through heterotrimeric G proteins.[supplied by OMIM]
