= GPR83 =

Protein-coding gene in the species Homo sapiens

Identifiers
- Aliases: GPR83, GIR, GPR72, G protein-coupled receptor 83
- External IDs: OMIM: 605569; MGI: 95712; GeneCards: GPR83

Gene location (Human)
Chr.	Chromosome 11 (human)
Band	11q21	Start	94,377,316 bp
Band	11q21	End	94,401,419 bp

Gene location (Mouse)
Chr.	Chromosome 9 (mouse)
Band	9 A2|9 4.4 cM	Start	14,771,506 bp
Band	9 A2|9 4.4 cM	End	14,782,085 bp
RNA expression pattern
Bgee	Human / Mouse (ortholog); Top expressed in: cerebellar vermis; middle temporal gyrus; cerebellar hemisphere; right hemisphere of cerebellum; Brodmann area 23; testicle; superior frontal gyrus; spinal ganglia; prefrontal cortex; entorhinal cortex / Top expressed in: olfactory tubercle; nucleus accumbens; pectoral muscles; pectoralis minor muscle; pectoralis major; mammillary body; lobe of prostate; globus pallidus; superior frontal gyrus; lumbar subsegment of spinal cord; More reference expression data
BioGPS	n/a
Gene ontology
Molecular function	neuropeptide Y receptor activity; G protein-coupled receptor activity; signal transducer activity
Cellular component	integral component of membrane; plasma membrane; membrane; non-motile cilium; cilium
Biological process	response to glucocorticoid; neuropeptide signaling pathway; signal transduction; G protein-coupled receptor signaling pathway
Sources:Amigo / QuickGO
Orthologs
Databases	NCBI: entry; OMA: entry
Species	Human	Mouse
Entrez	10888	14608
Ensembl	ENSG00000123901	ENSMUSG00000031932
UniProt	Q9NYM4	P30731
RefSeq (mRNA)	NM_016540; NM_001330345	NM_010287; NM_001310734
RefSeq (protein)	NP_001317274; NP_057624	NP_001297663; NP_034417
Location (UCSC)	Chr 11: 94.38 – 94.4 Mb	Chr 9: 14.77 – 14.78 Mb
PubMed search
- Wikidata
View/Edit Human	View/Edit Mouse

Probable G-protein coupled receptor 83 is a protein that in humans is encoded by the GPR83 gene.
