= GPR19 =

Protein-coding gene in the species Homo sapiens

Identifiers
- Aliases: GPR19, G protein-coupled receptor 19
- External IDs: OMIM: 602927; MGI: 892973; GeneCards: GPR19

Gene location (Human)
Chr.	Chromosome 12 (human)
Band	12p13.1	Start	12,660,890 bp
Band	12p13.1	End	12,696,207 bp

Gene location (Mouse)
Chr.	Chromosome 6 (mouse)
Band	6|6 G1	Start	134,846,056 bp
Band	6|6 G1	End	134,875,541 bp
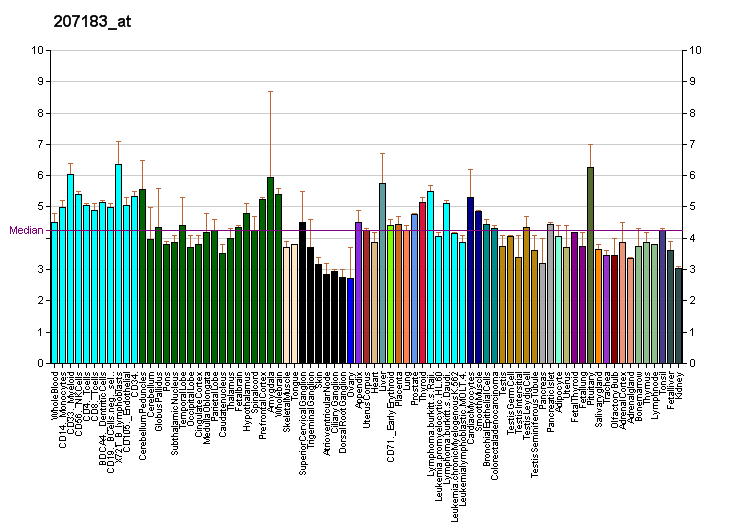
RNA expression pattern
Bgee	Human / Mouse (ortholog); Top expressed in: testicle; gonad; Brodmann area 23; endothelial cell; middle temporal gyrus; primary visual cortex; ganglionic eminence; cerebellar hemisphere; pituitary gland; right hemisphere of cerebellum / Top expressed in: spermatocyte; medial ganglionic eminence; spermatid; Rostral migratory stream; humerus; seminiferous tubule; zygote; pituitary gland; fibula; suprachiasmatic nucleus; More reference expression data
BioGPS	More reference expression data
Gene ontology
Molecular function	signal transducer activity; G protein-coupled receptor activity
Cellular component	integral component of plasma membrane; membrane; integral component of membrane; plasma membrane; cilium
Biological process	signal transduction; G protein-coupled receptor signaling pathway; neuropeptide signaling pathway; chemical synaptic transmission; feeding behavior
Sources:Amigo / QuickGO
Orthologs
Databases	NCBI: entry; OMA: entry
Species	Human	Mouse
Entrez	2842	14760
Ensembl	ENSG00000183150	ENSMUSG00000032641
UniProt	Q15760	Q61121
RefSeq (mRNA)	NM_006143	NM_001167693; NM_001167694; NM_001167695; NM_001167696; NM_001167697 NM_001167699; NM_001167700; NM_008157; NM_001362048; NM_001362049; NM_001362050; NM_001362051; NM_001362052
RefSeq (protein)	NP_006134	NP_001161166; NP_001161167; NP_001161168; NP_001161169; NP_001161171 NP_001161172; NP_032183; NP_001348977; NP_001348978; NP_001348979; NP_001348980; NP_001348981
Location (UCSC)	Chr 12: 12.66 – 12.7 Mb	Chr 6: 134.85 – 134.88 Mb
PubMed search
- Wikidata
View/Edit Human	View/Edit Mouse

Probable G-protein coupled receptor 19 is a protein that in humans is encoded by the GPR19 gene. GPR19 has been proposed as the receptor for the peptide hormone adropin.
