= GPR88 =

Protein-coding gene in humans

Identifiers
- Aliases: GPR88, STRG, COCPMR, G protein-coupled receptor 88
- External IDs: OMIM: 607468; MGI: 1927653; GeneCards: GPR88

Gene location (Human)
Chr.	Chromosome 1 (human)
Band	1p21.2	Start	100,538,139 bp
Band	1p21.2	End	100,542,021 bp

Gene location (Mouse)
Chr.	Chromosome 3 (mouse)
Band	3|3 G1	Start	116,043,303 bp
Band	3|3 G1	End	116,047,152 bp
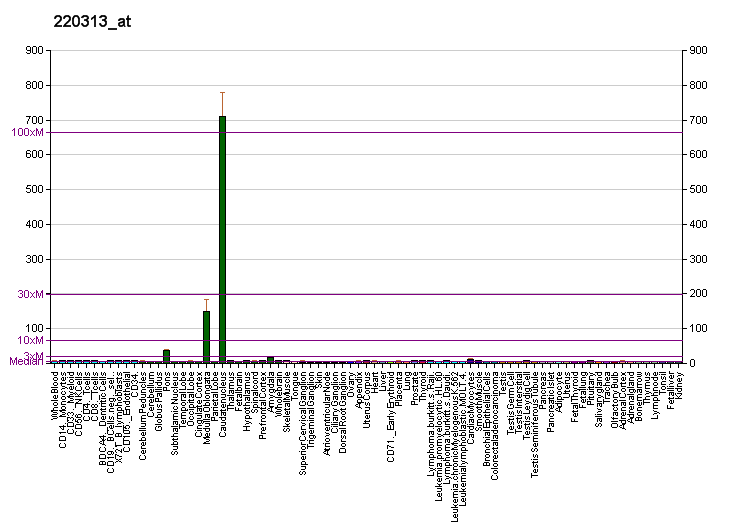
RNA expression pattern
Bgee	Human / Mouse (ortholog); Top expressed in: external globus pallidus; putamen; caudate nucleus; nucleus accumbens; endothelial cell; entorhinal cortex; middle temporal gyrus; prefrontal cortex; right lobe of liver; dorsolateral prefrontal cortex / Top expressed in: olfactory tubercle; globus pallidus; nucleus accumbens; superior frontal gyrus; lateral septal nucleus; piriform cortex; lumbar subsegment of spinal cord; temporal lobe; barrel cortex; primary visual cortex; More reference expression data
BioGPS	More reference expression data
Gene ontology
Molecular function	signal transducer activity; cytoskeletal motor activity; G protein-coupled receptor activity; G protein-coupled photoreceptor activity
Cellular component	integral component of membrane; membrane; nucleus; cytoplasm; plasma membrane; cellular component; integral component of plasma membrane; cilium
Biological process	locomotory behavior; neuromuscular process controlling balance; neuronal action potential; signal transduction; motor learning; G protein-coupled receptor signaling pathway; neuropeptide signaling pathway; chemical synaptic transmission; feeding behavior; phototransduction; detection of visible light; cellular response to light stimulus
Sources:Amigo / QuickGO
Orthologs
Databases	NCBI: entry; OMA: entry
Species	Human	Mouse
Entrez	54112	64378
Ensembl	ENSG00000181656	ENSMUSG00000068696
UniProt	Q9GZN0	Q9EPB7
RefSeq (mRNA)	NM_022049	NM_022427
RefSeq (protein)	NP_071332	NP_071872
Location (UCSC)	Chr 1: 100.54 – 100.54 Mb	Chr 3: 116.04 – 116.05 Mb
PubMed search
- Wikidata
View/Edit Human	View/Edit Mouse

Probable G-protein coupled receptor 88 is a protein that in humans is encoded by the GPR88 gene.

== Ligands ==
Agonists

- RTI-122
