= MAS1L =

Protein-coding gene in the species Homo sapiens

Identifiers
- Aliases: MAS1L, MAS-L, MRG, dJ994E9.2, MAS1 proto-oncogene like, G protein-coupled receptor
- External IDs: OMIM: 607235; GeneCards: MAS1L

Gene location (Human)
Chr.	Chromosome 6 (human)
Band	6p22.1	Start	29,486,697 bp
Band	6p22.1	End	29,487,956 bp
RNA expression pattern
Bgee	Human / Mouse (ortholog); Top expressed in: smooth muscle tissue; gallbladder; rectum; mucosa of transverse colon; subcutaneous adipose tissue; gonad; duodenum; right coronary artery; skin of abdomen; skin of leg / n/a; More reference expression data
BioGPS	n/a
Gene ontology
Molecular function	signal transducer activity; G protein-coupled receptor activity
Cellular component	integral component of membrane; plasma membrane; membrane; nucleoplasm; cytosol; integral component of plasma membrane
Biological process	G protein-coupled receptor signaling pathway; signal transduction
Sources:Amigo / QuickGO
Orthologs
Databases	NCBI: entry; OMA: entry
Species	Human	Mouse
Entrez	116511	n/a
Ensembl	ENSG00000206515; ENSG00000233141; ENSG00000206470; ENSG00000234954; ENSG00000228515 ENSG00000204687; ENSG00000237284; ENSG00000228377	n/a
UniProt	P35410	n/a
RefSeq (mRNA)	NM_052967	n/a
RefSeq (protein)	NP_443199	n/a
Location (UCSC)	Chr 6: 29.49 – 29.49 Mb	n/a
PubMed search		n/a
- Wikidata
View/Edit Human

Mas-related G-protein coupled receptor MRG is a protein that in humans is encoded by the MAS1L gene.

== See also ==
- MAS1 oncogene
