= VN1R4 =

Protein-coding gene in the species Homo sapiens

Identifiers
- Aliases: VN1R4, V1RL4, vomeronasal 1 receptor 4
- External IDs: MGI: 2159637; GeneCards: VN1R4

Gene location (Human)
Chr.	Chromosome 19 (human)
Band	19q13.42	Start	53,266,676 bp
Band	19q13.42	End	53,267,723 bp

Gene location (Mouse)
Chr.	Chromosome 17 (mouse)
Band	17|17 A3.2	Start	21,532,127 bp
Band	17|17 A3.2	End	21,535,174 bp
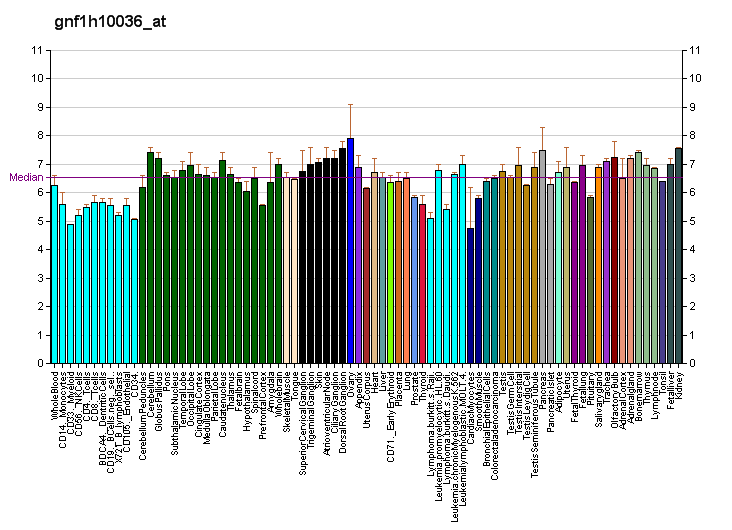
RNA expression pattern
Bgee	Human / Mouse (ortholog); Top expressed in: testicle / n/a; More reference expression data
BioGPS	More reference expression data
Gene ontology
Molecular function	G protein-coupled receptor activity; pheromone receptor activity; signal transducer activity; pheromone binding
Cellular component	integral component of membrane; plasma membrane; membrane
Biological process	G protein-coupled receptor signaling pathway; response to pheromone; signal transduction; sensory perception of chemical stimulus
Sources:Amigo / QuickGO
Orthologs
Databases	NCBI: entry; OMA: entry
Species	Human	Mouse
Entrez	317703	171234
Ensembl	ENSG00000228567	ENSMUSG00000058030
UniProt	Q7Z5H5	Q8R296
RefSeq (mRNA)	NM_173857	NM_134200
RefSeq (protein)	NP_776256	NP_598961
Location (UCSC)	Chr 19: 53.27 – 53.27 Mb	Chr 17: 21.53 – 21.54 Mb
PubMed search
- Wikidata
View/Edit Human	View/Edit Mouse

Vomeronasal type-1 receptor 4 is a protein that in humans is encoded by the VN1R4 gene.
