= GPR50 =

Protein-coding gene in humans

Identifiers
- Aliases: GPR50, H9, Mel1c, G protein-coupled receptor 50
- External IDs: OMIM: 300207; MGI: 1333877; GeneCards: GPR50

Gene location (Human)
Chr.	X chromosome (human)
Band	Xq28	Start	151,176,584 bp
Band	Xq28	End	151,181,465 bp

Gene location (Mouse)
Chr.	X chromosome (mouse)
Band	X A7.3|X 36.98 cM	Start	70,707,273 bp
Band	X A7.3|X 36.98 cM	End	70,712,863 bp
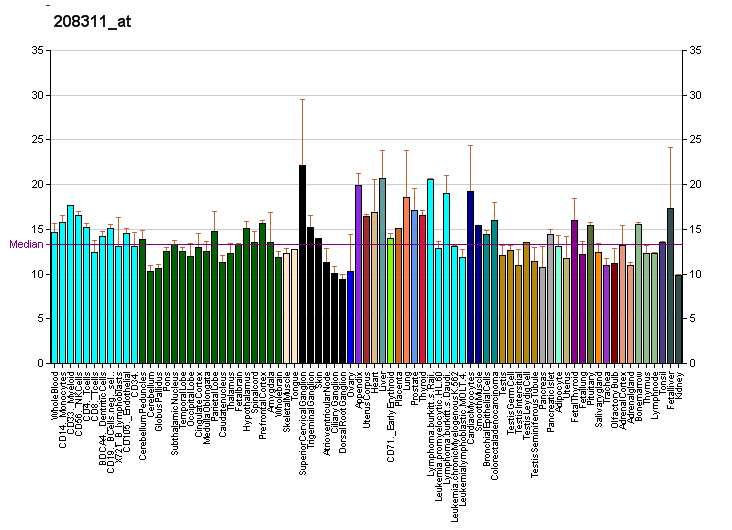
RNA expression pattern
Bgee	Human / Mouse (ortholog); Top expressed in: anterior pituitary; smooth muscle tissue; placenta; hypothalamus; ganglionic eminence; lymph node; islet of Langerhans; mucosa of esophagus; right adrenal cortex; uterus / Top expressed in: median eminence; arcuate nucleus; gastrula; intestinal villus; Ileal epithelium; perirhinal cortex; entorhinal cortex; choroid plexus of fourth ventricle; tracheobronchial tree; CA3 field; More reference expression data
BioGPS	More reference expression data
Gene ontology
Molecular function	melatonin receptor activity; G protein-coupled receptor activity; protein binding; signal transducer activity; identical protein binding
Cellular component	integral component of membrane; integral component of plasma membrane; membrane; nucleoplasm; plasma membrane
Biological process	cell-cell signaling; G protein-coupled receptor signaling pathway; signal transduction
Sources:Amigo / QuickGO
Orthologs
Databases	NCBI: entry; OMA: entry
Species	Human	Mouse
Entrez	9248	14765
Ensembl	ENSG00000102195	ENSMUSG00000056380
UniProt	Q13585	O88495
RefSeq (mRNA)	NM_004224	NM_010340; NM_001308501
RefSeq (protein)	NP_004215	NP_001295430; NP_034470
Location (UCSC)	Chr X: 151.18 – 151.18 Mb	Chr X: 70.71 – 70.71 Mb
PubMed search
- Wikidata
View/Edit Human	View/Edit Mouse

G protein-coupled receptor 50 is a protein which in humans is encoded by the GPR50 gene.

== Function ==
GPR50 is a member of the G protein-coupled receptor family of integral membrane proteins and is most closely related to the melatonin receptor. GPR50 is able to heterodimerize with both the MT_{1} and MT_{2} melatonin receptor subtypes. While GPR50 has no effect on MT_{2} function, GPR50 prevented MT_{1} from both binding melatonin and coupling to G proteins. GPR50 is the mammalian ortholog of melatonin receptor Mel1c described in non-mammalian vertebrates.

== Clinical significance ==
Certain polymorphisms of the GPR50 gene in females are associated with increased risk of developing bipolar affective disorder, major depressive disorder, and schizophrenia. Other GPR50 gene polymorphism are associated with higher fasting circulating triglyceride levels and lower circulating High-density lipoprotein levels.
