= GPR161 =

Protein-coding gene in humans

Identifiers
- Aliases: GPR161, RE2, G protein-coupled receptor 161
- External IDs: OMIM: 612250; MGI: 2685054; GeneCards: GPR161

Gene location (Human)
Chr.	Chromosome 1 (human)
Band	1q24.2	Start	168,079,542 bp
Band	1q24.2	End	168,137,667 bp

Gene location (Mouse)
Chr.	Chromosome 1 (mouse)
Band	1 H2.2|1 72.64 cM	Start	165,123,358 bp
Band	1 H2.2|1 72.64 cM	End	165,154,314 bp
RNA expression pattern
Bgee	Human / Mouse (ortholog); Top expressed in: ganglionic eminence; myometrium; buccal mucosa cell; ventricular zone; tail of epididymis; body of uterus; pars reticulata; stromal cell of endometrium; spinal ganglia; pars compacta / Top expressed in: subiculum; otic vesicle; Region I of hippocampus proper; ganglionic eminence; hand; lumbar spinal ganglion; morula; medial ganglionic eminence; hippocampus proper; ascending aorta; More reference expression data
BioGPS	n/a
Gene ontology
Molecular function	signal transducer activity; G protein-coupled receptor activity
Cellular component	plasma membrane; cell projection; membrane; ciliary membrane; integral component of membrane; endocytic vesicle membrane; cilium; recycling endosome
Biological process	multicellular organism development; signal transduction; G protein-coupled receptor signaling pathway; negative regulation of smoothened signaling pathway involved in dorsal/ventral neural tube patterning; adenylate cyclase-activating G protein-coupled receptor signaling pathway
Sources:Amigo / QuickGO
Orthologs
Databases	NCBI: entry; OMA: entry
Species	Human	Mouse
Entrez	23432	240888
Ensembl	ENSG00000143147	ENSMUSG00000040836
UniProt	Q8N6U8	B2RPY5
RefSeq (mRNA)	NM_001267609; NM_001267610; NM_001267611; NM_001267612; NM_001267613 NM_001267614; NM_007369; NM_153832; NM_001349632; NM_001349633; NM_001349634; NM_001349635; NM_001375883; NM_001375884; NM_001375885; NM_001381909	NM_001081126; NM_001310429; NM_001310430
RefSeq (protein)	NP_001254538; NP_001254539; NP_001254540; NP_001254541; NP_001254542 NP_001254543; NP_722561; NP_001336561; NP_001336562; NP_001336563; NP_001336564; NP_001362812; NP_001362813; NP_001362814; NP_001368838	NP_001074595; NP_001297358; NP_001297359
Location (UCSC)	Chr 1: 168.08 – 168.14 Mb	Chr 1: 165.12 – 165.15 Mb
PubMed search
- Wikidata
View/Edit Human	View/Edit Mouse

G-protein coupled receptor 161 is a protein that in humans is encoded by the GPR161 gene. It is located on primary cilia and regulates embryonic development through suppression of the hedgehog signaling pathway. It appears to act as a mechanoreceptor and may not require an endogenous ligand for activation.
