= GPR22 =

Protein-coding gene in humans

Identifiers
- Aliases: GPR22, G protein-coupled receptor 22
- External IDs: OMIM: 601910; MGI: 1920260; GeneCards: GPR22

Gene location (Human)
Chr.	Chromosome 7 (human)
Band	7q22.3	Start	107,470,018 bp
Band	7q22.3	End	107,475,684 bp

Gene location (Mouse)
Chr.	Chromosome 12 (mouse)
Band	12|12 A3	Start	31,756,866 bp
Band	12|12 A3	End	31,763,946 bp
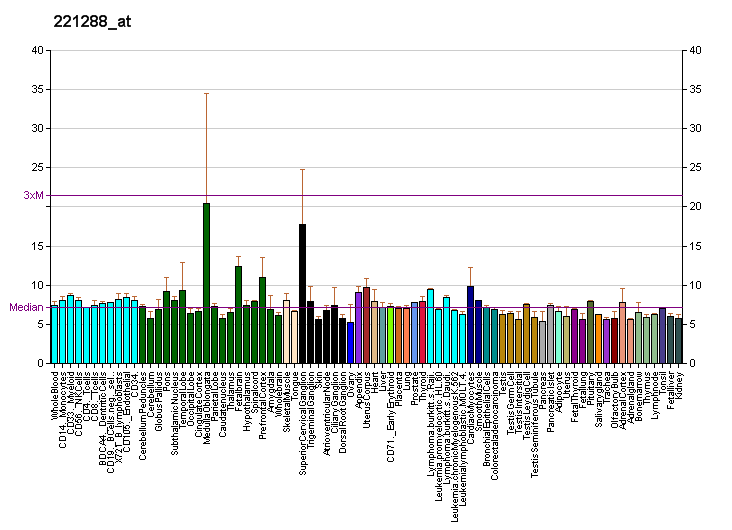
RNA expression pattern
Bgee	Human / Mouse (ortholog); Top expressed in: superior frontal gyrus; prefrontal cortex; testicle; dorsolateral prefrontal cortex; Brodmann area 9; anterior cingulate cortex; primary visual cortex; right frontal lobe; left ventricle; hippocampus proper / Top expressed in: subiculum; interventricular septum; subdivision of hippocampus; Region I of hippocampus proper; hippocampus proper; dentate gyrus; lobe of cerebellum; cerebellar vermis; primary motor cortex; piriform cortex; More reference expression data
BioGPS	More reference expression data
Gene ontology
Molecular function	peptide binding; signal transducer activity; G protein-coupled receptor activity
Cellular component	integral component of membrane; plasma membrane; membrane; integral component of plasma membrane
Biological process	cellular response to hormone stimulus; signal transduction; response to peptide; G protein-coupled receptor signaling pathway; cell projection organization
Sources:Amigo / QuickGO
Orthologs
Databases	NCBI: entry; OMA: entry
Species	Human	Mouse
Entrez	2845	73010
Ensembl	ENSG00000172209; ENSG00000283812	ENSMUSG00000044067
UniProt	Q99680; Q3KNS9	Q8BZL4
RefSeq (mRNA)	NM_005295	NM_175191
RefSeq (protein)	NP_005286; NP_005286.2	NP_780400
Location (UCSC)	Chr 7: 107.47 – 107.48 Mb	Chr 12: 31.76 – 31.76 Mb
PubMed search
- Wikidata
View/Edit Human	View/Edit Mouse

G-protein coupled receptor 22 is a protein that in humans is encoded by the GPR22 gene.
