= GPR20 =

Protein-coding gene in humans

Identifiers
- Aliases: GPR20, G protein-coupled receptor 20
- External IDs: OMIM: 601908; MGI: 2441803; GeneCards: GPR20

Gene location (Human)
Chr.	Chromosome 8 (human)
Band	8q24.3	Start	141,356,470 bp
Band	8q24.3	End	141,367,286 bp

Gene location (Mouse)
Chr.	Chromosome 15 (mouse)
Band	15|15 D3	Start	73,566,453 bp
Band	15|15 D3	End	73,579,354 bp
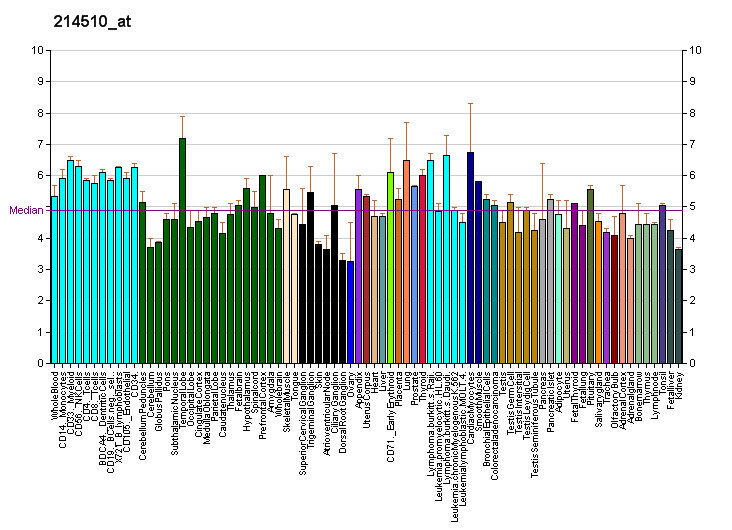
RNA expression pattern
Bgee	Human / Mouse (ortholog); Top expressed in: gonad; testicle; right coronary artery; popliteal artery; tibial arteries; left coronary artery; gastric mucosa; smooth muscle tissue; Descending thoracic aorta; left uterine tube / Top expressed in: external carotid artery; internal carotid artery; inner muscle layer; large intestine; colon; Paneth cell; embryo; left colon; primary oocyte; duodenum; More reference expression data
BioGPS	More reference expression data
Gene ontology
Molecular function	G protein-coupled receptor activity; signal transducer activity
Cellular component	integral component of membrane; receptor complex; plasma membrane; integral component of plasma membrane; membrane
Biological process	signal transduction; positive regulation of Rho protein signal transduction; positive regulation of cytosolic calcium ion concentration involved in phospholipase C-activating G protein-coupled signaling pathway; G protein-coupled receptor signaling pathway
Sources:Amigo / QuickGO
Orthologs
Databases	NCBI: entry; OMA: entry
Species	Human	Mouse
Entrez	2843	239530
Ensembl	ENSG00000204882; ENSG00000275181	ENSMUSG00000045281
UniProt	Q99678	Q8BYC4
RefSeq (mRNA)	NM_005293	NM_173365
RefSeq (protein)	NP_005284	NP_775541
Location (UCSC)	Chr 8: 141.36 – 141.37 Mb	Chr 15: 73.57 – 73.58 Mb
PubMed search
- Wikidata
View/Edit Human	View/Edit Mouse

G-protein coupled receptor 20 is a protein that in humans is encoded by the GPR20 gene.
