= GPR82 =

Protein-coding gene in humans

Identifiers
- Aliases: GPR82, G protein-coupled receptor 82
- External IDs: OMIM: 300748; MGI: 2441734; GeneCards: GPR82

Gene location (Human)
Chr.	X chromosome (human)
Band	Xp11.4	Start	41,724,181 bp
Band	Xp11.4	End	41,730,130 bp

Gene location (Mouse)
Chr.	X chromosome (mouse)
Band	X|X A1.1	Start	13,527,602 bp
Band	X|X A1.1	End	13,533,672 bp
RNA expression pattern
Bgee	Human / Mouse (ortholog); Top expressed in: epithelium of nasopharynx; buccal mucosa cell; palpebral conjunctiva; appendix; epithelium of colon; jejunal mucosa; lymph node; Achilles tendon; tonsil; white blood cell / Top expressed in: embryo; uterus; tail of embryo; ovary; genital tubercle; jejunum; ileum; neural tube; mesencephalon; lung; More reference expression data
BioGPS	n/a
Gene ontology
Molecular function	G protein-coupled receptor activity; signal transducer activity
Cellular component	integral component of membrane; plasma membrane; membrane
Biological process	G protein-coupled receptor signaling pathway; signal transduction
Sources:Amigo / QuickGO
Orthologs
Databases	NCBI: entry; OMA: entry
Species	Human	Mouse
Entrez	27197	319200
Ensembl	ENSG00000171657	ENSMUSG00000047678
UniProt	Q96P67	Q8BZR0
RefSeq (mRNA)	NM_080817	NM_175669
RefSeq (protein)	NP_543007	NP_783600
Location (UCSC)	Chr X: 41.72 – 41.73 Mb	Chr X: 13.53 – 13.53 Mb
PubMed search
- Wikidata
View/Edit Human	View/Edit Mouse

Probable G-protein coupled receptor 82 is a protein that in humans is encoded by the GPR82 gene.

G protein-coupled receptors (GPCRs, or GPRs) contain 7 transmembrane domains and transduce extracellular signals through heterotrimeric G proteins.[supplied by OMIM]
