= GPR176 =

Protein-coding gene in the species Homo sapiens

Identifiers
- Aliases: GPR176, HB-954, G protein-coupled receptor 176
- External IDs: OMIM: 612183; MGI: 2685858; GeneCards: GPR176

Gene location (Human)
Chr.	Chromosome 15 (human)
Band	15q14-q15.1	Start	39,799,008 bp
Band	15q14-q15.1	End	39,920,266 bp

Gene location (Mouse)
Chr.	Chromosome 2 (mouse)
Band	2|2 E5	Start	118,107,591 bp
Band	2|2 E5	End	118,203,900 bp
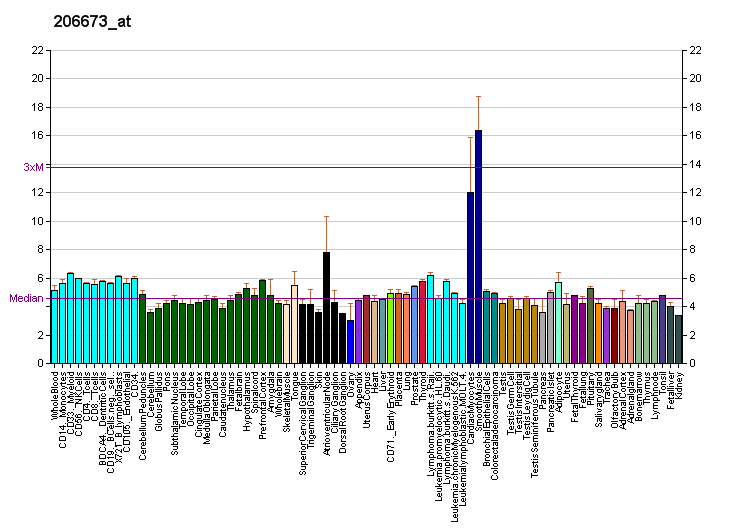
RNA expression pattern
Bgee	Human / Mouse (ortholog); Top expressed in: stromal cell of endometrium; ascending aorta; saphenous vein; right coronary artery; Descending thoracic aorta; pons; cerebellar hemisphere; right hemisphere of cerebellum; gonad; tibial arteries / Top expressed in: calvaria; stroma of bone marrow; suprachiasmatic nucleus; substantia nigra; arcuate nucleus; supraoptic nucleus; subiculum; lateral hypothalamus; paraventricular nucleus of hypothalamus; otic vesicle; More reference expression data
BioGPS	More reference expression data
Gene ontology
Molecular function	signal transducer activity; G protein-coupled receptor activity
Cellular component	integral component of membrane; integral component of plasma membrane; membrane; plasma membrane
Biological process	signal transduction; chemical synaptic transmission; G protein-coupled receptor signaling pathway; circadian behavior; rhythmic process; adenylate cyclase-inhibiting G protein-coupled receptor signaling pathway
Sources:Amigo / QuickGO
Orthologs
Databases	NCBI: entry; OMA: entry
Species	Human	Mouse
Entrez	11245	381413
Ensembl	ENSG00000166073	ENSMUSG00000040133
UniProt	Q14439	Q80WT4
RefSeq (mRNA)	NM_001271854; NM_001271855; NM_007223	NM_201367
RefSeq (protein)	NP_001258783; NP_001258784; NP_009154	NP_958755
Location (UCSC)	Chr 15: 39.8 – 39.92 Mb	Chr 2: 118.11 – 118.2 Mb
PubMed search
- Wikidata
View/Edit Human	View/Edit Mouse

Probable G-protein coupled receptor 176 is a protein that in humans is encoded by the GPR176 gene.

It is expressed by neurons in the suprachiasmatic nucleus, where it negatively regulates cAMP production in an apparently agonist-independent fashion. Its expression increases at night, indicating it may be involved in circadian rhythm within the brain. Rather than interacting with the canonical G_{i} protein, it interacts with G_{z}.
