= GPR45 =

Protein-coding gene in humans

Identifiers
- Aliases: GPR45, PSP24, PSP24(ALPHA), PSP24A, G protein-coupled receptor 45
- External IDs: OMIM: 604838; MGI: 2135882; GeneCards: GPR45

Gene location (Human)
Chr.	Chromosome 2 (human)
Band	2q12.1	Start	105,241,743 bp
Band	2q12.1	End	105,243,467 bp

Gene location (Mouse)
Chr.	Chromosome 1 (mouse)
Band	1|1 B	Start	42,992,032 bp
Band	1|1 B	End	43,074,616 bp
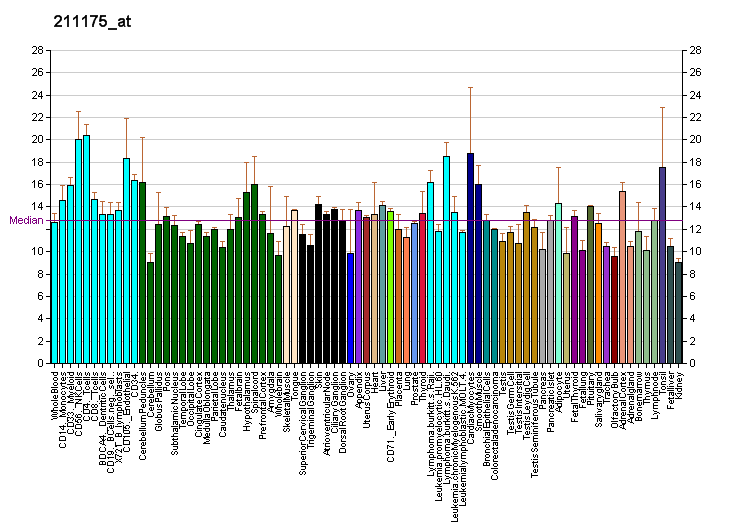
RNA expression pattern
Bgee	Human / Mouse (ortholog); Top expressed in: prefrontal cortex; right frontal lobe; Brodmann area 9; cingulate gyrus; anterior cingulate cortex; hypothalamus; nucleus accumbens; amygdala; embryo; caudate nucleus / Top expressed in: lumbar subsegment of spinal cord; ventricular zone; ganglionic eminence; arcuate nucleus; dentate gyrus of hippocampal formation granule cell; paraventricular nucleus of hypothalamus; primary visual cortex; dorsomedial hypothalamic nucleus; superior frontal gyrus; ventral tegmental area; More reference expression data
BioGPS	More reference expression data
Gene ontology
Molecular function	G protein-coupled receptor activity; signal transducer activity
Cellular component	integral component of membrane; plasma membrane; membrane
Biological process	signal transduction; G protein-coupled receptor signaling pathway
Sources:Amigo / QuickGO
Orthologs
Databases	NCBI: entry; OMA: entry
Species	Human	Mouse
Entrez	11250	93690
Ensembl	ENSG00000135973	ENSMUSG00000041907
UniProt	Q9Y5Y3	Q9EQQ4
RefSeq (mRNA)	NM_007227	NM_053107
RefSeq (protein)	NP_009158	NP_444337
Location (UCSC)	Chr 2: 105.24 – 105.24 Mb	Chr 1: 42.99 – 43.07 Mb
PubMed search
- Wikidata
View/Edit Human	View/Edit Mouse

Probable G-protein coupled receptor 45 is a protein that in humans is encoded by the GPR45 gene.

This intronless gene encodes a member of the G protein-coupled receptor (GPCR) family. Members of this protein family contain seven putative transmembrane domains and may mediate signaling processes to the interior of the cell via activation of heterotrimeric G proteins. This protein may function in the central nervous system.
