= GPR15 =

Protein-coding gene in the species Homo sapiens

Identifiers
- Aliases: GPR15, BOB, G protein-coupled receptor 15
- External IDs: OMIM: 601166; MGI: 1918473; GeneCards: GPR15

Gene location (Human)
Chr.	Chromosome 3 (human)
Band	3q11.2	Start	98,531,978 bp
Band	3q11.2	End	98,534,681 bp

Gene location (Mouse)
Chr.	Chromosome 16 (mouse)
Band	16|16 C1.2	Start	58,537,796 bp
Band	16|16 C1.2	End	58,539,433 bp
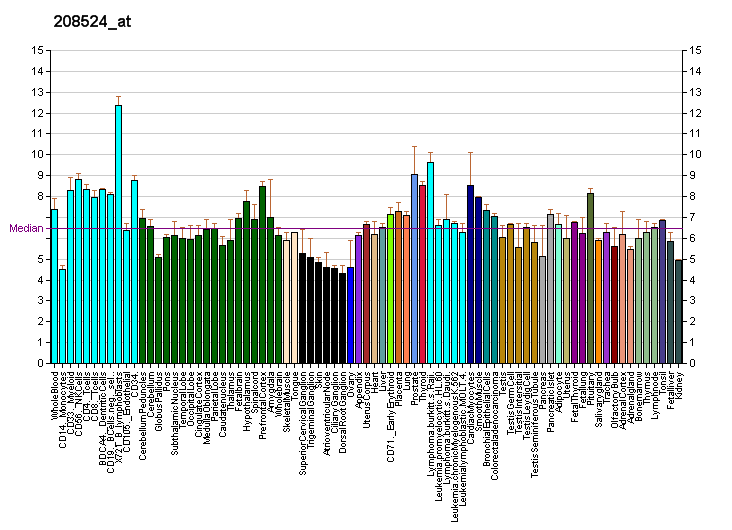
RNA expression pattern
Bgee	Human / Mouse (ortholog); Top expressed in: rectum; epithelium of colon; mucosa of transverse colon; appendix; bone marrow cell; gallbladder; lymph node; spleen; minor salivary glands; granulocyte / Top expressed in: spermatid; dentate gyrus of hippocampal formation granule cell; spermatocyte; cerebellar cortex; primary visual cortex; testicle; blood; vastus lateralis muscle; colon; temporal muscle; More reference expression data
BioGPS	More reference expression data
Gene ontology
Molecular function	signal transducer activity; virus receptor activity; G protein-coupled receptor activity; protein binding; coreceptor activity
Cellular component	integral component of membrane; integral component of plasma membrane; membrane; endosome; plasma membrane
Biological process	T cell migration; signal transduction; G protein-coupled receptor signaling pathway; viral entry into host cell
Sources:Amigo / QuickGO
Orthologs
Databases	NCBI: entry; OMA: entry
Species	Human	Mouse
Entrez	2838	71223
Ensembl	ENSG00000154165	ENSMUSG00000047293
UniProt	P49685	Q0VDU3
RefSeq (mRNA)	NM_005290	NM_001162955
RefSeq (protein)	NP_005281	NP_001156427
Location (UCSC)	Chr 3: 98.53 – 98.53 Mb	Chr 16: 58.54 – 58.54 Mb
PubMed search
- Wikidata
View/Edit Human	View/Edit Mouse

G protein-coupled receptor 15 is a protein that in humans is encoded by the GPR15 gene.

GPR15 is a class A orphan G protein-coupled receptor (heterotrimeric guanine nucleotide-binding protein, GPCR). The GPR15 gene is localized at chromosome 3q11.2-q13.1. It is found in epithelial cells, synovial macrophages, endothelial cells and lymphocytes especially T cells. From the mRNA sequence, a 40.8 kD molecular weight of GPR15 is proposed. In an epithelial tumor cell line (HT-29), however, a 36 kD band, composed of GPR15 and galactosyl ceramide, was detected. Protein expression in lymphocytes is strongly associated with hypomethylation of its gene.

== Tissue distribution ==
High gene expression was described for colonic mucosa, small bowel mucosa, liver, and spleen. Moderate gene expression was found in blood, lymph node, thymus, testis, and prostate. In peripheral blood, GPR15 is mainly found on T cells, especially on CD4+ T helper cells, and less prominent on B cells. By immunohistochemistry, GPR15 is found specifically in glandular cells of the stomach, α-cells of islet of Langerhans in pancreas, surface epithelium of small intestine and colon, hepatocytes in liver, tubular epithelium of the kidney and in diverse tumor tissues, such as glioblastoma, melanoma, small cell lung carcinoma or colon carcinoma.

== Function ==
The overall physiological role remains elusive. It seems to play a role in the homing of single T cell types to the colon. In humans, GPR15 controls, together with α4β7-integrin, the homing of effector T cells to the inflamed gut of ulcerative colitis. With respect to the homing of GPR15-expressing immune cells to the colon there are divergent mechanisms between human and rodents like mouse.

== Ligands ==
There are at least two endogenous ligands found recently. One ligand encoded by the human gene GPR15LG was identified as a robust marker for psoriasis whose abundance decreased after therapeutic treatment with anti-interleukin-17 antibody. Transcripts of GPR15LG are abundant in the cervix and colon. It is currently unknown whether GPR15LG causes disease symptoms or is the consequence of a disturbed epithelial barrier. It does not act as a chemotactic agent but rather decrease T cell migration suggesting a mechanism of heterologous receptor desensitization. The second ligand is a fragment of thrombomodulin exerting anti-inflammatory function in mice.

== Clinical significance ==
Human GPR15 was originally cloned as a co-receptor for HIV or the simian immunodeficiency virus. HIV-induced activation of GPR15 in enterocytes seems to cause HIV enteropathy accompanied by diarrhea and lipid malabsorption. In inflammatory bowel diseases (IBD) such as Crohn's disease and ulcerative colitis the proportion of GPR15-expressing cells among regulatory T cells is slightly increased in peripheral blood. In mouse, GPR15-deficient mice were prone to develop severe large intestine inflammation, which was rescued by the transfer of GPR15-sufficient T regs.

== Lifestyle ==
Chronic tobacco smoking is a very strong inducer of GPR15-expressing T cells in peripheral blood. Although the proportion of GPR15-expressing cells among T-cells in peripheral blood is a highly sensitive and specific biomarker for chronic tobacco smoking. It does not indicate a disturbed homeostasis in the lung.
