= GPR63 =

Protein-coding gene in the species Homo sapiens

Identifiers
- Aliases: GPR63, PSP24(beta), PSP24B, G protein-coupled receptor 63
- External IDs: OMIM: 606915; MGI: 2135884; GeneCards: GPR63

Gene location (Human)
Chr.	Chromosome 6 (human)
Band	6q16.1	Start	96,794,125 bp
Band	6q16.1	End	96,837,477 bp

Gene location (Mouse)
Chr.	Chromosome 4 (mouse)
Band	4|4 A3	Start	24,966,407 bp
Band	4|4 A3	End	25,009,233 bp
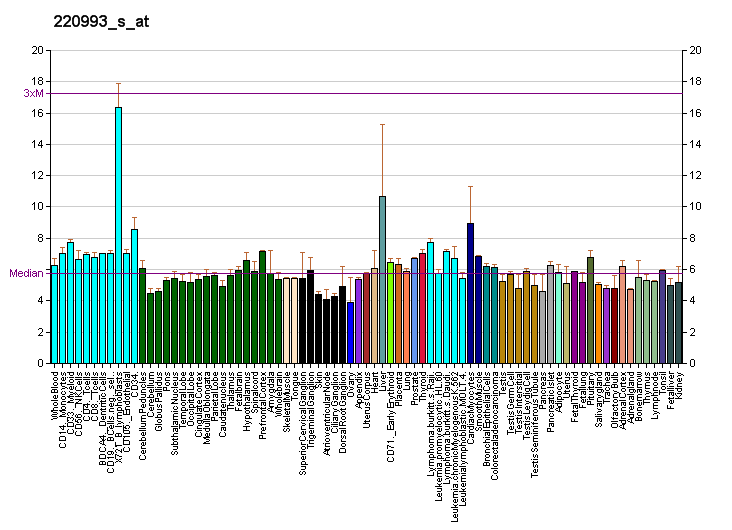
RNA expression pattern
Bgee	Human / Mouse (ortholog); Top expressed in: gonad; testicle; ventricular zone; ganglionic eminence; popliteal artery; tibial arteries; prefrontal cortex; right coronary artery; rectum; left coronary artery / Top expressed in: secondary oocyte; zygote; tail of embryo; dentate gyrus of hippocampal formation granule cell; primary visual cortex; ventricular zone; superior frontal gyrus; embryo; cerebellar cortex; genital tubercle; More reference expression data
BioGPS	More reference expression data
Gene ontology
Molecular function	G protein-coupled receptor activity; signal transducer activity; molecular function
Cellular component	integral component of membrane; receptor complex; membrane; nucleus; cytosol; plasma membrane
Biological process	G protein-coupled receptor signaling pathway; signal transduction; biological process
Sources:Amigo / QuickGO
Orthologs
Databases	NCBI: entry; OMA: entry
Species	Human	Mouse
Entrez	81491	81006
Ensembl	ENSG00000112218	ENSMUSG00000040372
UniProt	Q9BZJ6	Q9EQQ3
RefSeq (mRNA)	NM_001143957; NM_030784	NM_030733; NM_001379626; NM_001379627
RefSeq (protein)	NP_001137429; NP_110411	NP_109658; NP_001366555; NP_001366556
Location (UCSC)	Chr 6: 96.79 – 96.84 Mb	Chr 4: 24.97 – 25.01 Mb
PubMed search
- Wikidata
View/Edit Human	View/Edit Mouse

Probable G-protein coupled receptor 63 is a protein that in humans is encoded by the GPR63 gene.

G protein-coupled receptors (GPCRs, or GPRs) contain 7 transmembrane domains and transduce extracellular signals through heterotrimeric G proteins.[supplied by OMIM]
