= MAS1 =

Protein-coding gene in the species Homo sapiens

Identifiers
- Aliases: MAS1, MAS1 proto-oncogene, G protein-coupled receptor, MAS, MGRA
- External IDs: OMIM: 165180; MGI: 96918; GeneCards: MAS1

Gene location (Human)
Chr.	Chromosome 6 (human)
Band	6q25.3	Start	159,890,988 bp
Band	6q25.3	End	159,917,447 bp

Gene location (Mouse)
Chr.	Chromosome 17 (mouse)
Band	17 A1|17 8.69 cM	Start	13,059,966 bp
Band	17 A1|17 8.69 cM	End	13,087,030 bp
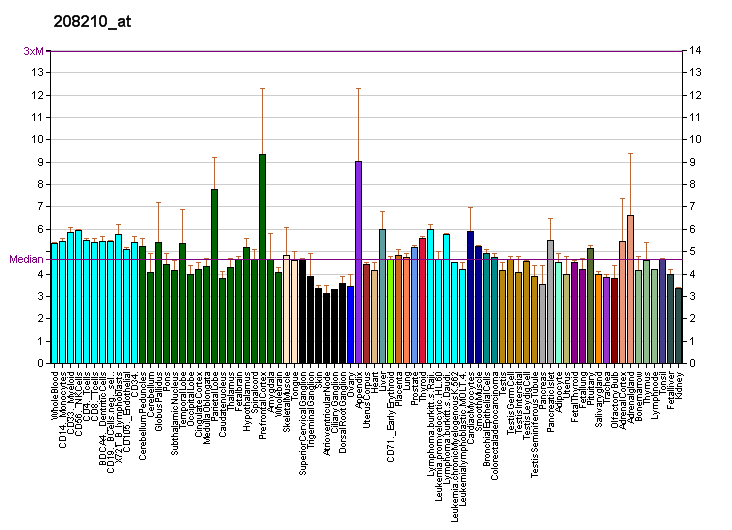
RNA expression pattern
Bgee	Human / Mouse (ortholog); Top expressed in: testicle; prefrontal cortex; Brodmann area 9; right frontal lobe; anterior cingulate cortex; primary visual cortex; hippocampus proper; gonad; amygdala; lymph node / Top expressed in: dentate gyrus of hippocampal formation granule cell; spermatid; CA3 field; entorhinal cortex; perirhinal cortex; Ileal epithelium; yolk sac; primary visual cortex; superior frontal gyrus; seminiferous tubule; More reference expression data
BioGPS	More reference expression data
Gene ontology
Molecular function	G protein-coupled receptor activity; angiotensin type II receptor activity; peptide binding; signal transducer activity; peptide hormone binding; angiotensin receptor activity; protein binding
Cellular component	integral component of membrane; membrane; plasma membrane; integral component of plasma membrane; cell surface; intracellular anatomical structure
Biological process	negative regulation of protein phosphorylation; G protein-coupled receptor signaling pathway; male gonad development; positive regulation of inositol phosphate biosynthetic process; angiotensin-activated signaling pathway; anatomical structure morphogenesis; response to peptide hormone; activation of NF-kappaB-inducing kinase activity; protein kinase C signaling; response to activity; response to gonadotropin; positive regulation of DNA replication; cellular response to peptide hormone stimulus; spermatogenesis; positive regulation of cell population proliferation; regulation of inflammatory response; cell population proliferation; hippocampus development; signal transduction
Sources:Amigo / QuickGO
Orthologs
Databases	NCBI: entry; OMA: entry
Species	Human	Mouse
Entrez	4142	17171
Ensembl	ENSG00000130368	ENSMUSG00000068037
UniProt	P04201	P30554
RefSeq (mRNA)	NM_002377; NM_001366704	NM_008552
RefSeq (protein)	NP_002368; NP_001353633	NP_032578
Location (UCSC)	Chr 6: 159.89 – 159.92 Mb	Chr 17: 13.06 – 13.09 Mb
PubMed search
- Wikidata
View/Edit Human	View/Edit Mouse

MAS proto-oncogene, or MAS1 proto-oncogene, G protein-coupled receptor (MRGA, MAS, MGRA), is a protein that in humans is encoded by the MAS1 gene. The structure of the MAS1 product indicates that it belongs to the class of receptors that are coupled to GTP-binding proteins and share a conserved structural motif, which is described as a '7-transmembrane segment' following the prediction that these hydrophobic segments form membrane-spanning alpha-helices. The MAS1 protein may be a receptor that, when activated, modulates a critical component in a growth-regulating pathway to bring about oncogenic effects.

Agonists of the receptor include angiotensin (1-7). Antagonist include A-779 (angiotensin-1-7 with c-terminal proline substituted for D-Ala), or D-Pro (angiotensin-1-7 with c-terminal proline submitted for D-proline).

Mas1 proto-oncogene (MAS1, MGRA) is not to be confused with the MAS-related G-protein coupled receptor, a recently believed to be activated by the ligand alamandine (generated by catalysis of Ang A via ACE2 or directly from Ang-(1-7)).

== See also ==
- MAS1 oncogene
