= GPR52 =

Protein-coding gene in humans

Identifiers
- Aliases: GPR52, G protein-coupled receptor 52
- External IDs: OMIM: 604106; MGI: 3643278; GeneCards: GPR52

Gene location (Human)
Chr.	Chromosome 1 (human)
Band	1q25.1	Start	174,447,964 bp
Band	1q25.1	End	174,449,545 bp

Gene location (Mouse)
Chr.	Chromosome 1 (mouse)
Band	1|1 H2.1	Start	160,403,908 bp
Band	1|1 H2.1	End	160,405,544 bp
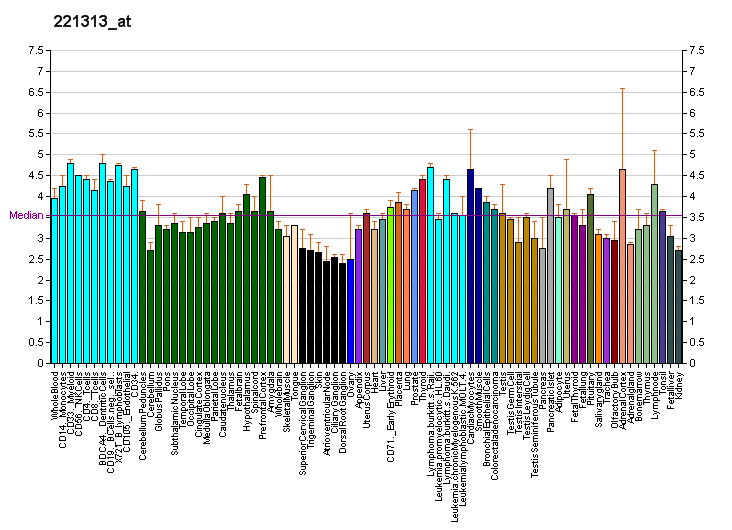
RNA expression pattern
Bgee	Human / Mouse (ortholog); Top expressed in: testicle; bone marrow cell; nucleus accumbens; prefrontal cortex; putamen; caudate nucleus; epithelium of colon; Achilles tendon; gonad; Brodmann area 9 / Top expressed in: striatum of neuraxis; superior frontal gyrus; embryo; primary visual cortex; hypothalamus; dentate gyrus of hippocampal formation granule cell; hippocampus proper; duodenum; granulocyte; ileum; More reference expression data
BioGPS	More reference expression data
Gene ontology
Molecular function	dopamine neurotransmitter receptor activity, coupled via Gs; signal transducer activity; G protein-coupled receptor activity; G protein-coupled photoreceptor activity
Cellular component	integral component of membrane; plasma membrane; integral component of plasma membrane; membrane
Biological process	G protein-coupled receptor signaling pathway; signal transduction; dopamine receptor signaling pathway; locomotory behavior; phototransduction; detection of visible light; cellular response to light stimulus
Sources:Amigo / QuickGO
Orthologs
Databases	NCBI: entry; OMA: entry
Species	Human	Mouse
Entrez	9293	620246
Ensembl	ENSG00000203737	ENSMUSG00000118401
UniProt	Q9Y2T5	P0C5J4
RefSeq (mRNA)	NM_005684	NM_001146330; NM_001368668
RefSeq (protein)	NP_005675	NP_001139802; NP_001355597
Location (UCSC)	Chr 1: 174.45 – 174.45 Mb	Chr 1: 160.4 – 160.41 Mb
PubMed search
- Wikidata
View/Edit Human	View/Edit Mouse

Probable G-protein coupled receptor 52 is a protein that in humans is encoded by the GPR52 gene.

Members of the G protein-coupled receptor (GPR) family play important roles in signal transduction from the external environment to the inside of the cell.[supplied by OMIM]

Cannabidiol, CBD, and O-1918 are Inverse agonist at GPR52.
