= GPR61 =

Protein-coding gene in humans

Identifiers
- Aliases: GPR61, BALGR, GPCR3, G protein-coupled receptor 61
- External IDs: OMIM: 606916; MGI: 2441719; GeneCards: GPR61

Gene location (Human)
Chr.	Chromosome 1 (human)
Band	1p13.3	Start	109,539,872 bp
Band	1p13.3	End	109,548,406 bp

Gene location (Mouse)
Chr.	Chromosome 3 (mouse)
Band	3|3 F2.3	Start	108,055,637 bp
Band	3|3 F2.3	End	108,062,198 bp
RNA expression pattern
Bgee	Human / Mouse (ortholog); Top expressed in: prefrontal cortex; right frontal lobe; Brodmann area 9; testicle; anterior pituitary; right hemisphere of cerebellum; cingulate gyrus; anterior cingulate cortex; hypothalamus; nucleus accumbens / Top expressed in: medial dorsal nucleus; medial geniculate nucleus; ventromedial nucleus; piriform cortex; inferior colliculi; lateral geniculate nucleus; central gray substance of midbrain; anterior amygdaloid area; paraventricular nucleus of hypothalamus; medial vestibular nucleus; More reference expression data
BioGPS	n/a
Gene ontology
Molecular function	G protein-coupled receptor activity; signal transducer activity; protein binding; arrestin family protein binding
Cellular component	integral component of membrane; receptor complex; membrane; plasma membrane; endosome; endosome membrane
Biological process	signal transduction; G protein-coupled receptor signaling pathway; positive regulation of cAMP-mediated signaling
Sources:Amigo / QuickGO
Orthologs
Databases	NCBI: entry; OMA: entry
Species	Human	Mouse
Entrez	83873	229714
Ensembl	ENSG00000156097	ENSMUSG00000046793
UniProt	Q9BZJ8	Q8C010
RefSeq (mRNA)	NM_031936; NM_001393907	NM_175470; NM_001305461
RefSeq (protein)	NP_114142	NP_001292390
Location (UCSC)	Chr 1: 109.54 – 109.55 Mb	Chr 3: 108.06 – 108.06 Mb
PubMed search
- Wikidata
View/Edit Human	View/Edit Mouse

Probable G-protein coupled receptor 61 is a protein that in humans is encoded by the GPR61 gene.

This gene belongs to the G-protein coupled receptor 1 family. G protein-coupled receptors contain 7 transmembrane domains and transduce extracellular signals through heterotrimeric G proteins. The protein encoded by this gene is most closely related to biogenic amine receptors.

== See also ==
- GPR61+receptor,+human at the U.S. National Library of Medicine Medical Subject Headings (MeSH)
