= GPR137B =

Mammalian protein found in humans

Identifiers
- Aliases: GPR137B, TM7SF1, G protein-coupled receptor 137B
- External IDs: OMIM: 604658; MGI: 1891463; GeneCards: GPR137B

Gene location (Human)
Chr.	Chromosome 1 (human)
Band	1q42.3	Start	236,142,505 bp
Band	1q42.3	End	236,221,865 bp

Gene location (Mouse)
Chr.	Chromosome 13 (mouse)
Band	13 A1|13 5.24 cM	Start	13,532,205 bp
Band	13 A1|13 5.24 cM	End	13,568,599 bp
RNA expression pattern
Bgee	Human / Mouse (ortholog); Top expressed in: retinal pigment epithelium; trigeminal ganglion; internal globus pallidus; oocyte; corpus epididymis; kidney tubule; spinal ganglia; secondary oocyte; nucleus accumbens; caudate nucleus / Top expressed in: right kidney; morula; lens; epithelium of lens; proximal tubule; sciatic nerve; calvaria; blastocyst; human kidney; granulocyte; More reference expression data
BioGPS	n/a
Orthologs
Databases	NCBI: entry; OMA: entry
Species	Human	Mouse
Entrez	7107	83924
Ensembl	ENSG00000077585	ENSMUSG00000021306
UniProt	O60478	Q8BNQ3
RefSeq (mRNA)	NM_003272	NM_031999
RefSeq (protein)	NP_003263	NP_114388
Location (UCSC)	Chr 1: 236.14 – 236.22 Mb	Chr 13: 13.53 – 13.57 Mb
PubMed search
- Wikidata
View/Edit Human	View/Edit Mouse

G protein-coupled receptor 137B also known as GPR137B is a G protein-coupled receptor which in humans is encoded by the GPR137B gene. The expression of GPR137B is upregulated during kidney development.
