= VN1R1 =

Protein-coding gene in the species Homo sapiens

Identifiers
- Aliases: VN1R1, V1RL1, VNR19I1, ZVNH1, ZVNR1, vomeronasal 1 receptor 1
- External IDs: OMIM: 605234; GeneCards: VN1R1

Gene location (Human)
Chr.	Chromosome 19 (human)
Band	19q13.43	Start	57,454,790 bp
Band	19q13.43	End	57,457,140 bp
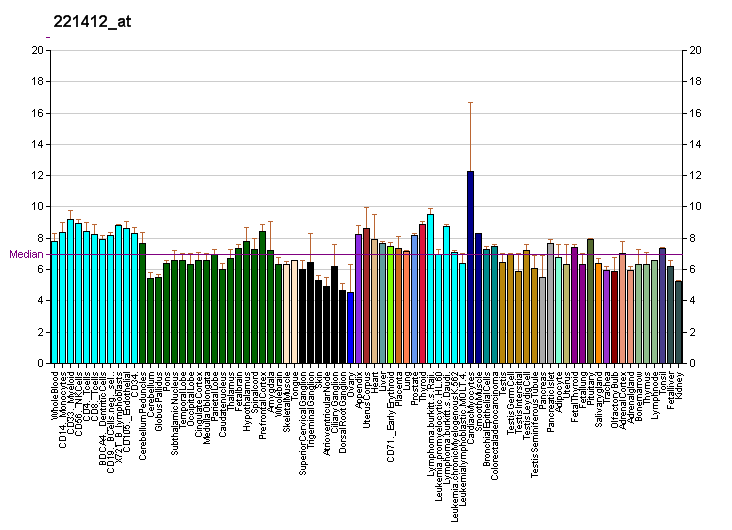
RNA expression pattern
Bgee	Human / Mouse (ortholog); Top expressed in: gonad; cerebellar cortex; cerebellar hemisphere; right hemisphere of cerebellum; primary visual cortex; skeletal muscle tissue; superior frontal gyrus; gastrocnemius muscle; ganglionic eminence; pituitary gland / n/a; More reference expression data
BioGPS	More reference expression data
Gene ontology
Molecular function	G protein-coupled receptor activity; pheromone receptor activity; signal transducer activity; pheromone binding
Cellular component	integral component of membrane; plasma membrane; membrane
Biological process	G protein-coupled receptor signaling pathway; response to pheromone; signal transduction; sensory perception of chemical stimulus; biological process
Sources:Amigo / QuickGO
Orthologs
Databases	NCBI: entry; OMA: entry
Species	Human	Mouse
Entrez	57191	n/a
Ensembl	ENSG00000178201	n/a
UniProt	Q9GZP7	n/a
RefSeq (mRNA)	NM_020633	n/a
RefSeq (protein)	NP_065684	n/a
Location (UCSC)	Chr 19: 57.45 – 57.46 Mb	n/a
PubMed search		n/a
- Wikidata
View/Edit Human

Vomeronasal type-1 receptor 1 is a protein that in humans is encoded by the VN1R1 gene.

== Function ==
Pheromones are chemical signals that elicit specific behavioral responses and physiologic alterations in recipients of the same species. The protein encoded by this gene is similar to pheromone receptors and is primarily localized to the olfactory mucosa. An alternate splice variant of this gene is thought to exist, but its full length nature has not been determined.

== Ligands ==
- (-)-Carveol
- 2-Heptanone
- Octanal
- Nonanal
- Decanal
- Hedione
- Iso E Super
