= VN1R3 =

Protein-coding gene in the species Homo sapiens

Identifiers
- Aliases: VN1R3, V1RL3, V1RL3p, FKSG46, vomeronasal 1 receptor 3 (gene/pseudogene), vomeronasal 1 receptor 3
- External IDs: GeneCards: VN1R3
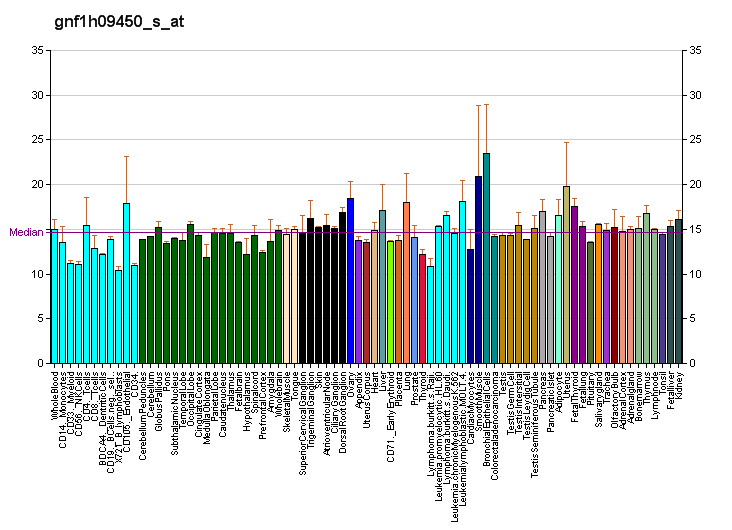
RNA expression pattern
Bgee	Human / Mouse (ortholog); Top expressed in: testicle; myometrium; pancreas; uterus; female human reproductive system; organ system; material anatomical entity; vagina / n/a; More reference expression data
BioGPS	More reference expression data
Gene ontology
Molecular function	G protein-coupled receptor activity; pheromone receptor activity; signal transducer activity; pheromone binding
Cellular component	integral component of membrane; plasma membrane; membrane
Biological process	G protein-coupled receptor signaling pathway; response to pheromone; signal transduction; sensory perception of chemical stimulus
Sources:Amigo / QuickGO
Orthologs
Databases	NCBI: entry
Species	Human	Mouse
Entrez	317702	n/a
Ensembl	n/a	n/a
UniProt	Q9BXE9	n/a
RefSeq (mRNA)	NM_174980	n/a
RefSeq (protein)	NP_778145	n/a
Location (UCSC)	n/a	n/a
PubMed search		n/a
- Wikidata
View/Edit Human

Vomeronasal type-1 receptor 3 is a protein that is encoded by the VN1R3 gene in humans.
