= CCRL2 =

Protein-coding gene in humans

Identifiers
- Aliases: CCRL2, ACKR5, CKRX, CRAM, CRAM-A, CRAM-B, HCR, C-C motif chemokine receptor like 2
- External IDs: OMIM: 608379; MGI: 1920904; GeneCards: CCRL2

Gene location (Human)
Chr.	Chromosome 3 (human)
Band	3p21.31	Start	46,407,166 bp
Band	3p21.31	End	46,412,997 bp

Gene location (Mouse)
Chr.	Chromosome 9 (mouse)
Band	9 F2|9 60.92 cM	Start	110,883,554 bp
Band	9 F2|9 60.92 cM	End	110,886,587 bp
RNA expression pattern
Bgee	Human / Mouse (ortholog); Top expressed in: mucosa of transverse colon; rectum; upper lobe of left lung; mucosa of sigmoid colon; appendix; monocyte; right lung; granulocyte; spleen; bone marrow cell / Top expressed in: granulocyte; right lung lobe; embryo; muscle of thigh; stroma of bone marrow; triceps brachii muscle; vastus lateralis muscle; digastric muscle; left lung; temporal muscle; More reference expression data
BioGPS	n/a
Gene ontology
Molecular function	G protein-coupled receptor activity; chemokine receptor activity; signal transducer activity; CCR chemokine receptor binding; chemokine receptor binding; C-C chemokine receptor activity; chemokine binding; C-C chemokine binding
Cellular component	integral component of membrane; plasma membrane; integral component of plasma membrane; membrane; cytoplasm; external side of plasma membrane
Biological process	chemotaxis; G protein-coupled receptor signaling pathway; signal transduction; chemokine-mediated signaling pathway; inflammatory response; immune response; positive regulation of cytosolic calcium ion concentration; calcium-mediated signaling; cell chemotaxis
Sources:Amigo / QuickGO
Orthologs
Databases	NCBI: entry; OMA: entry
Species	Human	Mouse
Entrez	9034	54199
Ensembl	ENSG00000121797	ENSMUSG00000043953
UniProt	O00421	O35457
RefSeq (mRNA)	NM_001130910; NM_003965	NM_017466; NM_001302376; NM_001302377
RefSeq (protein)	NP_001124382; NP_003956	NP_001289305; NP_001289306; NP_059494
Location (UCSC)	Chr 3: 46.41 – 46.41 Mb	Chr 9: 110.88 – 110.89 Mb
PubMed search
- Wikidata
View/Edit Human	View/Edit Mouse

C-C chemokine receptor-like 2 is a protein that in humans is encoded by the CCRL2 gene. Recently it was found that CCRL2 also acts as a receptor for the chemokine chemerin.

== Function ==
This gene encodes a chemokine receptor like protein, which is predicted to be a seven transmembrane protein and most closely related to CCR1. Chemokines and their receptors mediated signal transduction are critical for the recruitment of effector immune cells to the site of inflammation. This gene is expressed at high levels in primary neutrophils and primary monocytes, and is further upregulated on neutrophil activation and during monocyte to macrophage differentiation. The function of this gene is unknown. This gene is mapped to the region where the chemokine receptor gene cluster is located.
