= VN1R2 =

Protein-coding gene in the species Homo sapiens

Identifiers
- Aliases: VN1R2, V1RL2, vomeronasal 1 receptor 2
- External IDs: MGI: 3645524; GeneCards: VN1R2

Gene location (Human)
| Chr. | Chromosome 19 (human) |
| Band | 19q13.42 | Start | 53,258,292 bp |
| Band | 19q13.42 | End | 53,261,837 bp |

Gene location (Mouse)
| Chr. | Chromosome 17 (mouse) |
| Band | 17|17 A3.2 | Start | 20,634,408 bp |
| Band | 17|17 A3.2 | End | 20,645,605 bp |
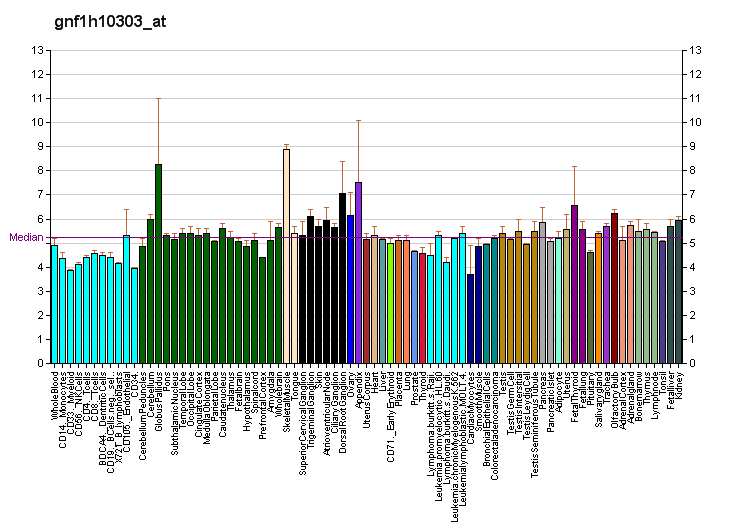
RNA expression pattern
| Bgee | Human / Mouse (ortholog); Top expressed in: testicle; gonad; right testis; left testis; right coronary artery; cerebellar hemisphere; right hemisphere of cerebellum; amygdala; nucleus accumbens; occipital lobe / n/a; More reference expression data |
| BioGPS | More reference expression data |
Gene ontology
| Molecular function | G protein-coupled receptor activity; pheromone receptor activity; signal transducer activity; pheromone binding |
| Cellular component | integral component of membrane; plasma membrane; membrane |
| Biological process | G protein-coupled receptor signaling pathway; response to pheromone; signal transduction; sensory perception of chemical stimulus |
Sources:Amigo / QuickGO
Orthologs
| Databases | NCBI: entry; OMA: entry |
| Species | Human | Mouse |
| Entrez | 317701 | 665525 |
| Ensembl | ENSG00000196131 | ENSMUSG00000091151 |
| UniProt | Q8NFZ6 | E9PWK2 |
| RefSeq (mRNA) | NM_173856 | NM_001166735 |
| RefSeq (protein) | NP_776255 | NP_001160207 |
| Location (UCSC) | Chr 19: 53.26 – 53.26 Mb | Chr 17: 20.63 – 20.65 Mb |
| PubMed search |
- Wikidata
| View/Edit Human | View/Edit Mouse |

Vomeronasal type-1 receptor 2 is a protein that in humans is encoded by the VN1R2 gene.
