= VN1R5 =

Protein-coding gene in humans

Identifiers
- Aliases: VN1R5, V1RL5, vomeronasal 1 receptor 5 (gene/pseudogene)
- External IDs: GeneCards: VN1R5

Gene location (Human)
Chr.	Chromosome 1 (human)
Band	1q44	Start	247,255,972 bp
Band	1q44	End	247,257,210 bp
RNA expression pattern
Bgee	Human / Mouse (ortholog); Top expressed in: olfactory zone of nasal mucosa; hypothalamus / n/a; More reference expression data
BioGPS	n/a
Gene ontology
Molecular function	G protein-coupled receptor activity; pheromone receptor activity; signal transducer activity; pheromone binding
Cellular component	integral component of membrane; plasma membrane; membrane
Biological process	G protein-coupled receptor signaling pathway; response to pheromone; signal transduction; sensory perception of chemical stimulus
Sources:Amigo / QuickGO
Orthologs
Databases	NCBI: entry; OMA: entry
Species	Human	Mouse
Entrez	317705	n/a
Ensembl	ENSG00000197617	n/a
UniProt	Q7Z5H4	n/a
RefSeq (mRNA)	NM_173858	n/a
RefSeq (protein)	NP_776257	n/a
Location (UCSC)	Chr 1: 247.26 – 247.26 Mb	n/a
PubMed search		n/a
- Wikidata
View/Edit Human

Vomeronasal type-1 receptor 5 is a protein that in humans is encoded by the VN1R5 gene.
