= MAS1 oncogene =

Protein receptor

Identifiers
- Symbol: MAS1
- NCBI gene: 4142
- HGNC: 6899
- OMIM: 165180
- RefSeq: NM_002377
- UniProt: P04201

Other data
- Locus: Chr. 6 q24-q27
Search for
- Structures: Swiss-model
- Domains: InterPro

MAS1 oncogene-like

Identifiers
- Symbol: MAS1L
- NCBI gene: 116511
- HGNC: 13961
- OMIM: 607235
- RefSeq: NM_052967
- UniProt: P35410

Other data
- Locus: Chr. 6 p21
Search for
- Structures: Swiss-model
- Domains: InterPro

The MAS1 oncogene (MAS receptor) is a G protein-coupled receptor which binds the angiotensin II metabolite angiotensin (1-7). The MAS1 receptor, when activated by binding angiotensin-(1-7), opposes many of the effects of the angiotensin II receptor. Hence, MAS1 receptor agonists have similar therapeutic effects to angiotensin II receptor antagonists, including lowering of blood pressure.
