= C150 =

C150, C-150 or variation, may refer to:

== Transportation and vehicles ==
=== Aviation ===
- Cessna 150 (C-150); an AvGas propeller-driven two-seat high-wing tricycle-gear general-aviation light-aircraft airplane
  - Cessna 150/152
- Bombardier CSeries C150, later CS500, renamed Airbus A220-500; regional jet airliner
- Caudron C.150; a French airplane

=== Automotive ===
- Centurion C-150, a crew-cab truck variant of the Ford Bronco
- Chevrolet 150, a 1950s economy fleet car

== Other uses ==
- Olympus C-150, a digital camera
- Bill C-150, a Canadian federal law, a 1960s omnibus bill that modified the Canadian Criminal Code
- ASTM C150, a Portland cement standard

== See also ==
- Airbus CC-150 Polaris, RCAF multipurpose A310 variant
- Kapawe'no 150C or Halcro 150C (Indian Reserve 150C), a Canadian Indian reserve in Alberta
- C15 (disambiguation)
- 150 (disambiguation)
