= Hepatokine =

Hormone-like proteins from liver cells

Hepatokines (Greek heapto-, liver; and -kinos, movement) are proteins produced by liver cells (hepatocytes) that are secreted into the circulation and function as hormones across the organism. Research is mostly focused on hepatokines that play a role in the regulation of metabolic diseases such as diabetes and fatty liver and include: Adropin, ANGPTL4, Fetuin-A, Fetuin-B, FGF-21, Hepassocin, LECT2, RBP4,Selenoprotein P, Sex hormone-binding globulin.

== Function ==
Hepatokines are hormone-like proteins secreted by hepatocytes, and many have been associated with extra-hepatic metabolic regulation. Through processes like autocrinem, paracrinem, and endocrine signaling, hepatokines can influence metabolic processes. Hepatocytes can secrete multiple hepatokines into the blood. In particular, these hepatokines, similar to hypothalamic hormones and insulin, are structurally polypeptides, and proteins and are transcribed and expressed by specific genes.

The liver may emit hepatokines to influence energy homeostasis and inflammation under pressure on the metabolism like long-term starvation or over-nutrition. If the liver is unable to fulfill this process, the corresponding disease develops like fatty liver disease from, "impaired hepatic insulin-sensitizing substance production." Hepatokines signal energy status and help regulate nutrient availability to multiple peripheral tissues and the central nervous system (CNS). Hepatokines have been described to be involved in the regulation of energy and nutrient metabolism by acting directly on the liver or on distal target tissues. These proteins regulate glucose and lipid metabolism in the liver but also in the skeletal muscle or the adipose tissue. It is now clear that a single session of exercise is accompanied by the production of liver-secreted proteins. Hepatokines can also mediate the beneficial effects of chronic exercise or, at least, represent biomarkers of training-induced metabolic improvements. Hepatokines directly affect the progression of atherosclerosis by modulating endothelial dysfunction and infiltration of inflammatory cells into vessel walls.

== Types ==
- Fetuin-A was the first hepatokine to be described and correlated with increased inflammation and insulin resistance.
- Fetuin-B significantly increases hepatic steatosis and mediates impaired insulin action and glucose intolerance.
- ANGPTL8/betatrophin, initially proposed for its action on beta cell proliferation, although this effect has recently been brought into question.
- FGF-21 an insulin-sensitising hormone that is an appealing drug target because of its beneficial metabolic actions.
- Adropin is linked to macronutrient intake and estrogen.
- ANGPTL4 can inhibit lipoprotein lipase and activate cAMP-stimulated lipolysis in adipocytes.

== Clinical significance ==
Hepatokines can serve as biomarkers and are potential therapeutic targets for metabolic diseases. The liver through execretion of hepatokines regulates the whole bodies metabolism in response to stress signals.

Secreted hepatokines in response to exercise induce favorable metabolic changes in fat, blood vessels, and skeletal muscle that can reduce metabolic diseases.

Although substantial progress has been made in understanding disease-controlled production of hepatokines, there is still so much to discover. There is so much room for discovery. For example, "little is known about the inductive mechanism of transcriptional reprogramming, protein translation, modification, and secretion of hepatokines, particularly through the ER and Golgi, and more. The identification and functional characterization of hepatokines may provide significant insights that could help in better understanding of MetS pathogenesis.

=== Non-alcoholic fatty liver disease ===
Hepatokines, sometimes referred to as hepatocytes-derived cytokines have been shown to relate to metabolic dysfunction–associated steatotic liver disease. "Mounting evidence has revealed that the secretory profiles of hepatokines are significantly altered in metabolic dysfunction–associated steatotic liver disease (MASLD), the most common hepatic manifestation, which frequently precedes other metabolic disorders, including insulin resistance and type 2 diabetes. Therefore, deciphering the mechanism of hepatokine-mediated inter-organ communication is essential for understanding the complex metabolic network between tissues, as well as for the identification of novel diagnostic and/or therapeutic targets in metabolic disease. Not only are they involved with metabolic diseases, but they are also linked to diseases of other organs, such as the heart, muscle, bone, and eyes. Recently, it was reported that hepatokine, a secretory protein released from the liver, could affect muscle and fat metabolic phenotypes in an endocrine-dependent manner.

== Metabolic diseases ==
Early studies in the area reported that a liver-derived protein, alpha2-HS Glycoprotein, also known as Fetuin-A, can inhibit insulin tyrosine kinase activation and might play a role in the pathogenesis of metabolic disorders. Results suggest that hepatokine production could remodel metabolic homeostasis. This is exemplified by a number of studies revealing that hepatokines play a pivotal role in metabolism and contribute to the development of obesity, insulin resistance, T2D, NAFL, and NASH (109, 149). So far, ~20 hepatokines have been described to be involved in the regulation of energy and nutrient metabolism by acting directly on the liver or on distal target tissues. Hepatokines can be remodelled depending on the environment, for example, exercise-training can remodel hepatokine secretion. Little work in human hepatokines has been performed, however, using precision-cut liver slicing of human livers with and without MASH over 2000 hepatokines were described with potential roles in either promoting or protecting cardiometabolic disease pathogenesis. Hepatokines are now considered potential targets for the treatment of cardiometabolic disorders.

== See also ==
- Adipokines
- Myokines
