= C18H24O4 =

The molecular formula C_{18}H_{24}O_{4} (molar mass: 304.38 g/mol, exact mass: 304.1675 u) may refer to:

- Estetrol (15α-hydroxyestriol)
- 2-Hydroxyestriol
- 4-Hydroxyestriol, or estra-1,3,5(10)-triene-3,4,16α,17β-tetrol
- Navamepent
- Penitanzacid F
