= CMKLR1 =

Protein-coding gene in humans

Identifiers
- Aliases: CMKLR1, CHEMERINR, ChemR23, DEZ, RVER1, chemerin chemokine-like receptor 1, CCX832
- External IDs: OMIM: 602351; MGI: 109603; GeneCards: CMKLR1

Gene location (Human)
Chr.	Chromosome 12 (human)
Band	12q23.3	Start	108,288,044 bp
Band	12q23.3	End	108,339,317 bp

Gene location (Mouse)
Chr.	Chromosome 5 (mouse)
Band	5|5 F	Start	113,750,415 bp
Band	5|5 F	End	113,788,487 bp
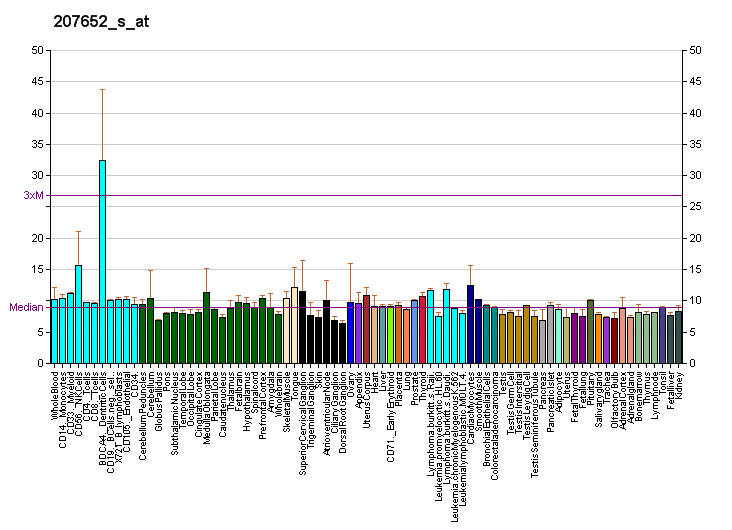

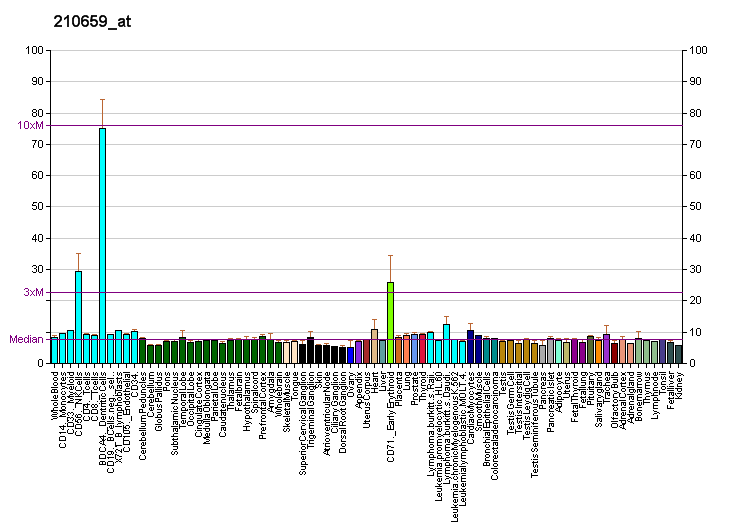
RNA expression pattern
Bgee	Human / Mouse (ortholog); Top expressed in: right coronary artery; Descending thoracic aorta; Achilles tendon; tendon of biceps brachii; ascending aorta; granulocyte; spleen; left coronary artery; monocyte; tibial arteries / Top expressed in: zygote; secondary oocyte; white adipose tissue; primary oocyte; subcutaneous adipose tissue; tail of embryo; internal carotid artery; mesenteric lymph nodes; stroma of bone marrow; external carotid artery; More reference expression data
BioGPS	More reference expression data
Gene ontology
Molecular function	G protein-coupled receptor activity; protein binding; chemokine receptor activity; signal transducer activity; signaling receptor activity
Cellular component	integral component of membrane; integral component of plasma membrane; membrane; plasma membrane
Biological process	chemotaxis; skeletal system development; G protein-coupled receptor signaling pathway; positive regulation of macrophage chemotaxis; negative regulation of NF-kappaB transcription factor activity; positive regulation of fat cell differentiation; immune response; regulation of calcium-mediated signaling; signal transduction; negative regulation of interleukin-12 production; chemokine-mediated signaling pathway; complement receptor mediated signaling pathway; inflammatory response; phospholipase C-activating G protein-coupled receptor signaling pathway; positive regulation of cytosolic calcium ion concentration; positive regulation of cold-induced thermogenesis
Sources:Amigo / QuickGO
Orthologs
Databases	NCBI: entry; OMA: entry
Species	Human	Mouse
Entrez	1240	14747
Ensembl	ENSG00000174600	ENSMUSG00000042190
UniProt	Q99788	P97468
RefSeq (mRNA)	NM_004072; NM_001142343; NM_001142344; NM_001142345	NM_008153; NM_001359060
RefSeq (protein)	NP_001135815; NP_001135816; NP_001135817; NP_004063	NP_032179; NP_001345989
Location (UCSC)	Chr 12: 108.29 – 108.34 Mb	Chr 5: 113.75 – 113.79 Mb
PubMed search
- Wikidata
View/Edit Human	View/Edit Mouse

Chemokine like receptor 1 also known as ChemR23 (Chemerin Receptor 23) is a protein that in humans is encoded by the CMKLR1 gene. Chemokine receptor-like 1 is a G protein-coupled receptor for the chemoattractant adipokine chemerin and the omega-3 fatty acid eicosapentaenoic acid-derived specialized pro-resolving molecule, resolvin E1 (see Specialized proresolving mediators#EPA-derived resolvins (i.e. RvE)). The murine receptor that shares almost 80% homology with the human receptor, is called Dez.

== Tissue distribution ==
CMKLR1 shows wide RNA expression profile but is notably high in plasmacytoid dendritic cells, macrophages, cardiomyocytes, adipocytes and endothelial cells.

== Function ==
Activating CMKLR1 by an agonist mobilizes intracellular calcium and causes the activation of several other signaling cascades like the ERK1 and NF-κB. Initial studies of CMKLR1 suggested that it might have a role in the inflammatory pathways. Its cognate ligand, chemerin was found in joint aspirate from rheumatoid arthritis and absent in aspirate from degenerative arthritis. CMKLR1 expression by plasmacytoid dendritic cells and macrophages also helped foster this idea. In vitro chemotaxis assays showed it to be utilized in attracting these cells. As an adipokine receptor it has a role in adipogenesis and adipocyte maturation. It seems also to have a role in peripheral insulin resistance.

Also studies using the mouse zymosan model and chemerin peptides showed that these peptides suppressed and helped resolve the peritonitis in mice. The same model showed that this particular molecule enhances macrophage efferocytosis (phagocyting apoptotic cells).

== Ligands ==
Agonists

- RvE1
- Navamepent

Antagonists

- CCX832 is an orally active molecule used as a tool compound in experimental pharmacology. It antagonises the effect of CMKLR1. Its chemical structure is undisclosed. The substance was originally developed for use as a pharmaceutical drug against inflammatory diseases by ChemoCentryx, a pharmaceutical firm based in California, in alliance with GlaxoSmithKline (GSK). Development was terminated after a Phase I clinical trial in 2012.
- ChemR23-IN-1
- ChemR23-IN-2
- ChemR23-IN-3
- ChemR23-IN-4
- VU0514009
