= Tinlarebant =

Chemical compound

Identifiers
- IUPAC name: 1-[3-[4-[3,4-difluoro-2-(trifluoromethyl)phenyl]piperidine-1-carbonyl]-1,4,5,7-tetrahydropyrazolo[3,4-c]pyridin-6-yl]ethanone
- CAS Number: 1821327-95-0
- PubChem CID: 92044505
- DrugBank: DB17832
- ChemSpider: 68006872
- UNII: 63WI9S8P1M
- KEGG: D12351
- ChEMBL: ChEMBL3967849
- PDB ligand: A1DE1 (PDBe, RCSB PDB)

Chemical and physical data
- Formula: C_{21}H_{21}F_{5}N_{4}O_{2}
- Molar mass: 456.417 g·mol^{−1}
- 3D model (JSmol): Interactive image
- SMILES: CC(=O)N1CCC2=C(C1)NN=C2C(=O)N3CCC(CC3)C4=C(C(=C(C=C4)F)F)C(F)(F)F
- InChI: InChI=1S/C21H21F5N4O2/c1-11(31)30-9-6-14-16(10-30)27-28-19(14)20(32)29-7-4-12(5-8-29)13-2-3-15(22)18(23)17(13)21(24,25)26/h2-3,12H,4-10H2,1H3,(H,27,28); Key:HAGSLCBZFRRBLS-UHFFFAOYSA-N

Tinlarebant is a investigational new drug that is being evaluated to treat dry macular degeneration and Stargardt disease. It is a retinol binding protein 4 antagonist.
