= Chemerin peptide =

Class of peptides

retinoic acid receptor responder (tazarotene induced) 2

Identifiers
- Symbol: RARRES2
- Alt. symbols: chemerin
- NCBI gene: 5919
- HGNC: 9868
- OMIM: 601973
- RefSeq: NM_002889
- UniProt: Q99969

Other data
- Locus: Chr. 7 q36.1
Search for
- Structures: Swiss-model
- Domains: InterPro

Chemerin peptides are short peptides (on the order of 9 amino acids) that are produced from the carboxyl terminus of the chemokine chemerin. Chemerin is an chemotactic adipokine; essentially a signalling protein that is involved in adipogenesis and immune response. Chemerin peptides display the same activities as chemerin, although at higher efficacy and potency.

== Chemerin-derived peptides ==
A particular synthetic chemerin-derived peptide, termed C15, was developed at Oxford University. It showed anti-inflammatory activities. Intraperitoneal administration of C15 (0.32 ng/kg) to mice before zymosan challenge conferred significant protection against zymosan-induced peritonitis, suppressing neutrophil (63%) and monocyte (62%) recruitment with a concomitant reduction in proinflammatory mediator expression.

C15 was found to promote phagocytosis and efferocytosis in peritoneal macrophages at picomolar concentrations. C15 enhanced macrophage clearance of microbial particles and apoptotic cells by factor of 360% in vitro.

Another chemerin-derived peptide, termed C-20, was developed at the Shenzhen Institute of Advanced Technology. Administration C-20 uncovered its high affinity binding to chemerin receptors CMKLR1 and GPR1, mimicking chemerin’s activity but with lower potency. C-20 triggered receptor internalization, promoted chemotaxis, and mildly suppressed hormone production (testosterone and progesterone), suggesting its potential as a tool to study chemerin-related signaling pathways.

== See also ==
- Chemerin
- CMKLR1
- Chemokine
- Efferocytosis
