= Chemerin =

Protein found in humans

RARRES2

Identifiers
- Aliases: RARRES2, HP10433, TIG2, Chemerin, retinoic acid receptor responder 2
- External IDs: OMIM: 601973; MGI: 1918910; GeneCards: RARRES2

Gene location (Human)
Chr.	Chromosome 7 (human)
Band	7q36.1	Start	150,338,317 bp
Band	7q36.1	End	150,341,662 bp

Gene location (Mouse)
Chr.	Chromosome 6 (mouse)
Band	6|6 B2.3	Start	48,546,630 bp
Band	6|6 B2.3	End	48,549,723 bp
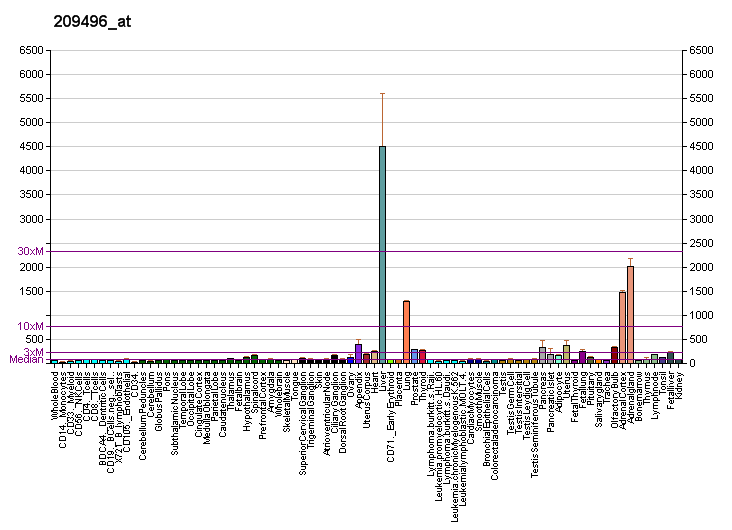
RNA expression pattern
Bgee	Human / Mouse (ortholog); Top expressed in: right adrenal cortex; left adrenal cortex; right lobe of liver; left ovary; right ovary; canal of the cervix; left uterine tube; body of pancreas; body of uterus; tibial nerve / Top expressed in: left lobe of liver; ascending aorta; white adipose tissue; decidua; lactiferous gland; aortic valve; uterus; gallbladder; right lung lobe; umbilical cord; More reference expression data
BioGPS	More reference expression data
Gene ontology
Molecular function	protein binding; signaling receptor binding
Cellular component	extracellular matrix; platelet dense granule lumen; extracellular region; extracellular space; collagen-containing extracellular matrix
Biological process	in utero embryonic development; embryonic digestive tract development; positive regulation of macrophage chemotaxis; chemotaxis; retinoid metabolic process; cell differentiation; inflammatory response; regulation of lipid catabolic process; platelet degranulation; positive regulation of protein phosphorylation; positive regulation of fat cell differentiation; positive regulation of chemotaxis; innate immune response; insulin receptor signaling pathway
Sources:Amigo / QuickGO
Orthologs
Databases	NCBI: entry; OMA: entry
Species	Human	Mouse
Entrez	5919	71660
Ensembl	ENSG00000106538	ENSMUSG00000009281
UniProt	Q99969	Q9DD06
RefSeq (mRNA)	NM_002889	NM_027852; NM_001347167; NM_001347168
RefSeq (protein)	NP_002880; NP_002880.1	NP_001334096; NP_001334097; NP_082128
Location (UCSC)	Chr 7: 150.34 – 150.34 Mb	Chr 6: 48.55 – 48.55 Mb
PubMed search
- Wikidata
View/Edit Human	View/Edit Mouse

Chemerin, also known as retinoic acid receptor responder protein 2 (RARRES2), tazarotene-induced gene 2 protein (TIG2), or RAR-responsive protein TIG2 is a protein that in humans is encoded by the RARRES2 gene.

== Function ==
Retinoids exert biologic effects such as potent growth inhibitory and cell differentiation activities and are used in the treatment of hyperproliferative dermatological diseases. These effects are mediated by specific nuclear receptor proteins that are members of the steroid and thyroid hormone receptor superfamily of transcriptional regulators. RARRES1, RARRES2 (this gene), and RARRES3 are genes whose expression is upregulated by the synthetic retinoid tazarotene. RARRES2 is thought to act as a cell surface receptor.

Chemerin is a chemoattractant protein that acts as a ligand for the G protein-coupled receptor CMKLR1 (also known as ChemR23). Chemerin is a 14 kDa protein secreted in an inactive form as prochemerin and is activated through cleavage of the C-terminus by inflammatory and coagulation serine proteases.

Chemerin was found to stimulate chemotaxis of dendritic cells and macrophages to the site of inflammation.

In humans, chemerin mRNA is highly expressed in white adipose tissue, liver and lung while its receptor, CMKLR1 is predominantly expressed in immune cells as well as adipose tissue. Because of its role in adipocyte differentiation and glucose uptake, chemerin is classified as an adipokine.

== Role as an adipokine ==
Chemerin has been implicated in autocrine / paracrine signaling for adipocyte differentiation and also stimulation of lipolysis. Studies with 3T3-L1 cells have shown chemerin expression is low in pre-differentiated adipocytes but its expression and secretion increases both during and after differentiation in vitro. Genetic knockdown of chemerin or its receptor, CMKLR1 impairs differentiation into adipocytes, and reduces the expression of GLUT4 and adiponectin, while increasing expression of IL-6 and insulin receptor. Furthermore, post-differentiation knockdown of chemerin reduced GLUT4, leptin, adiponectin, perilipin, and reduced lipolysis, suggesting chemerin plays a role in metabolic function of mature adipocytes. Studies using mature human adipocytes, 3T3-L1 cells, and in vivo studies in mice showed chemerin stimulates the phosphorylation of the MAPKs, ERK1, and ERK2, which are involved in mediating lipolysis.

Studies in mice have shown neither chemerin nor CMKLR1 are highly expressed in brown adipose tissue, indicating that chemerin plays a role in energy storage rather than thermogenesis.^{2}

== Role in obesity and diabetes ==
Given chemerin's role as a chemoattractant and a recent finding macrophages have been implicated in chronic inflammation of adipose tissue in obesity. This suggests chemerin may play an important role in the pathogenesis of obesity and insulin resistance.

Studies in mice found that feeding mice a high-fat diet resulted in increased expression of both chemerin and CMKLR1. In humans, chemerin levels are significantly different between individuals with normal glucose tolerance and individuals with type II diabetes and first degree relatives. Moreover, chemerin levels show a significant correlation with body mass index, plasma triglyceride levels and blood pressure.

It was found incubation of 3T3-L1 cells with recombinant human chemerin protein facilitated insulin-stimulated glucose uptake. This suggests chemerin plays a role in insulin sensitivity and may be a potential therapeutic target for treating type II diabetes.
