= Goodpasture-antigen-binding protein kinase =

Phosphate-transferring enzyme

Identifiers
- EC no.: 2.7.11.9

Databases
- IntEnz: IntEnz view
- BRENDA: BRENDA entry
- ExPASy: NiceZyme view
- KEGG: KEGG entry
- MetaCyc: metabolic pathway
- PRIAM: profile
- PDB structures: RCSB PDB PDBe PDBsum
Search
- PMC: articles
- PubMed: articles
- NCBI: proteins

In enzymology, a Goodpasture-antigen-binding protein kinase (EC 2.7.11.9) is an enzyme that catalyzes the chemical reaction

ATP + Goodpasture antigen-binding protein $\rightleftharpoons$ ADP + [Goodpasture antigen-binding phosphoprotein]

Thus, the two substrates of this enzyme are ATP and Goodpasture antigen-binding protein, whereas its two products are ADP and Goodpasture antigen-binding phosphoprotein.

This enzyme belongs to the family of transferases, specifically those transferring a phosphate group to the sidechain oxygen atom of serine or threonine residues in proteins (protein-serine/threonine kinases). The systematic name of this enzyme class is ATP:[Goodpasture antigen-binding protein] phosphotransferase. Other names in common use include GPBPK, GPBP kinase, STK11, and Goodpasture antigen-binding protein kinase. This enzyme participates in mTOR signaling pathway and adipocytokine signaling pathway.
