= Enho =

Enho may refer to:

- Enhō Yūya, Japanese sumo wrestler
- ENHO, Energy Homeostasis Associated gene coding for adropin
