= RNF135 =

Protein-coding gene in the species Homo sapiens

Identifiers
- Aliases: RNF135, MMFD, REUL, Riplet, L13, ring finger protein 135
- External IDs: OMIM: 611358; MGI: 1919206; GeneCards: RNF135
Enzyme activity
EC #	BRENDA	ExPASy	KEGG	MetaCyc
2.3.2.27	↗	↗	↗	↗

Gene location (Human)
Chr.	Chromosome 17 (human)
Band	17q11.2	Start	30,970,984 bp
Band	17q11.2	End	30,999,911 bp

Gene location (Mouse)
Chr.	Chromosome 11 (mouse)
Band	11 B5|11 47.59 cM	Start	80,074,677 bp
Band	11 B5|11 47.59 cM	End	80,090,583 bp
RNA expression pattern
Bgee	Human / Mouse (ortholog); Top expressed in: pancreatic ductal cell; parietal pleura; synovial membrane; visceral pleura; skin of arm; mucosa of ileum; secondary oocyte; gingival epithelium; human penis; synovial joint / Top expressed in: proximal tubule; right kidney; epithelium of small intestine; granulocyte; interventricular septum; utricle; left lobe of liver; spleen; lacrimal gland; ciliary body; More reference expression data
BioGPS	n/a
Gene ontology
Molecular function	ribonucleoprotein complex binding; protein binding; metal ion binding; ubiquitin-protein transferase activity; identical protein binding; transferase activity
Cellular component	cytoplasm; cytosol
Biological process	positive regulation of interferon-beta production; negative regulation of type I interferon production; innate immune response; regulation of innate immune response; protein ubiquitination; immune system process
Sources:Amigo / QuickGO
Orthologs
Databases	NCBI: entry; OMA: entry
Species	Human	Mouse
Entrez	84282	71956
Ensembl	ENSG00000181481	ENSMUSG00000020707
UniProt	Q8IUD6	Q9CWS1
RefSeq (mRNA)	NM_001184992; NM_032322; NM_197939	NM_028019
RefSeq (protein)	NP_001171921; NP_115698; NP_922921	NP_082295
Location (UCSC)	Chr 17: 30.97 – 31 Mb	Chr 11: 80.07 – 80.09 Mb
PubMed search
- Wikidata
View/Edit Human	View/Edit Mouse

RING finger protein 135 is a protein that in humans is encoded by the RNF135 gene.

The protein encoded by this gene contains a RING finger domain, a motif present in a variety of functionally distinct proteins and known to be involved in protein-protein and protein-DNA interactions. This gene is located in a chromosomal region known to be frequently deleted in patients with neurofibromatosis. Alternatively spliced transcript variants encoding distinct isoforms have been reported.

== Interactions ==
RNF135 has been shown to interact with RARRES3.
