= SERPINA12 =

Identifiers
- Aliases: SERPINA12, OL-64, serpin family A member 12
- External IDs: OMIM: 617471; MGI: 1915304; GeneCards: SERPINA12
Available structures
PDB	Ortholog search: PDBe RCSB
PDB	List of PDB id codes 4IF8, 4Y3K, 4Y40, 5EI0

Gene location (Human)
Chr.	Chromosome 14 (human)
Band	14q32.13	Start	94,487,274 bp
Band	14q32.13	End	94,517,844 bp

Gene location (Mouse)
Chr.	Chromosome 12 (mouse)
Band	12|12 E	Start	103,995,028 bp
Band	12|12 E	End	104,010,702 bp
RNA expression pattern
Bgee	Human / Mouse (ortholog); Top expressed in: skin of leg; skin of thigh; skin of hip; skin of abdomen; testicle; nipple; human penis; vulva; right lobe of liver; right uterine tube / Top expressed in: left lobe of liver; skin of external ear; lip; skin of back; umbilical cord; skin of abdomen; sexually immature organism; embryo; mucous cell of stomach; epidermis; More reference expression data
BioGPS	n/a
Gene ontology
Molecular function	peptidase inhibitor activity; serine-type endopeptidase inhibitor activity
Cellular component	extracellular region; plasma membrane; extracellular space
Biological process	regulation of cholesterol metabolic process; negative regulation of gluconeogenesis; positive regulation of phosphatidylinositol 3-kinase signaling; positive regulation of insulin receptor signaling pathway; regulation of triglyceride metabolic process; negative regulation of peptidase activity; negative regulation of lipid biosynthetic process; negative regulation of endopeptidase activity
Sources:Amigo / QuickGO
Orthologs
Databases	NCBI: entry; OMA: entry
Species	Human	Mouse
Entrez	145264	68054
Ensembl	ENSG00000165953	ENSMUSG00000041567
UniProt	Q8IW75	Q7TMF5
RefSeq (mRNA)	NM_001304461; NM_173850; NM_001382267	NM_026535
RefSeq (protein)	NP_001291390; NP_776249; NP_001369196	NP_080811
Location (UCSC)	Chr 14: 94.49 – 94.52 Mb	Chr 12: 104 – 104.01 Mb
PubMed search
- Wikidata
View/Edit Human	View/Edit Mouse

Serpin A12 (OL-64, Vaspin, Visceral adipose-specific serpin, Ser A12) is a glycoprotein that is a class A member of the serine protease inhibitor (serpin) family. In humans, Serpin A12 is encoded by the SERPINA12 gene.

First discovered in 2005, Serpin A12 was highly expressed in white adipose tissue of Otsuka Long Evans Tokushima Fatty Rats at the same time that the rats' obesity and insulin plasma levels reached a peak, at around 30 weeks old. Eventually, it was found to be expressed in visceral and subcutaneous adipose tissue of obese humans, leading the protein to be linked with obesity, glucose metabolism, and insulin resistance.

== General information ==
Serpin A12
Family	Serpin
Class	A
Gene name	SERPINA12
Organism	Human (Homo sapiens sapiens)
Type of biomolecule	Protein
Molecular weight	47 kDa
Amino acid count	414

== Function ==
Serpin A12 is a protease inhibitor with an approximate weight of 47 kDa and is a member of the adipokine family of cytokines excreted by adipose tissue. Members of this family regulate a number of cellular processes, such as inflammation mediation and insulin resistance. Made up of 414 amino acids, its main function is modulating the insulin inhibiting protease KLK7, mainly in adipose tissue.

Among other functions, Serpin A12 performs insulin-sensitizing actions. Serpin A12 treatment of obese and insulin-resistant mice has been shown to decrease the expression of insulin resistance genes in white adipose tissue as well as improving carbohydrate resistance.

Serpin A12 also increases bone density, which helps prevent osteoporosis. It does so by regulating osteoblasts, assisting in their mineralization of the bone matrix, thus balancing bone formation with bone resorption.

== History ==
In 2005, Serpin A12 was discovered to be found in rats, mice, and humans. One study confirmed that those with insulin resistance had higher levels of Serpin A12 than others. Thus, those humans (or animals) who were diabetic had more Serpin A12 than those who were not. The explanation for this lies in the fact that type 2 diabetes is related to inflammation processes, hence coinciding with the anti-inflammatory effect of Serpin A12.

== Mode of Action ==
Serpin A12 is secreted by visceral adipose tissue. Some of its roles include activation of GLUT4 and STAT3, and increasing acetylcholine and nitric oxide levels. It also inhibits NF-κB, decreases the production of cysteine-rich protein, HOMA-IR, low-density lipoprotein C, leptin, etc.

The function of insulin is to allow the movement of glucose into the cells, and for this it binds to the insulin receptor's tyrosine-kinase, causing, first, the phosphorylation of tyrosine and, then, the activation of the insulin receptor substrate. The insulin receptor substrate, in turn, activates protein kinase-B by stimulating the PI3K protein, and eventually glucose transporters will be inside the cell. If the activation of this pathway is inhibited, glucose will not be able to enter the cell. The NF-κB protein is responsible for regulating inflammation in adipose tissue, so the activation of this protein leads to inflammation, which leads to insulin resistance, since the phosphorylation of tyrosine is interrupted. Serpin A12 inhibits the activation of the protein NF-κB, and thus insulin resistance is decreased.

== Structure ==
Serpin A12 is coded by the 14q32.13 gene, on the 14th chromosome. Serpin A12 is made up of 414 amino acids. Its molecular weight is approximately 47kDa.

=== Domain ===
Serpin A12 has a single protein domain consisting of 7 to 9 alpha helices and 3 beta strands (A,B,C).

== Serpin group ==
Serpins are a large group of proteins with similar structures. "Serpin" is derived from "serine protease inhibitors", which denotes the group's main characteristic, the inhibition of protease enzymes. More than 1000 serpins have been identified among humans, plants, bacteria, parasites, and some viruses.

The first proteins from this group that were studied were antithrombin and antitrypsin, which are blood proteins. Scientists discovered that the two share a large number of amino acid sequences that were also common to ovalbumin. So, they thought they may be faced with a new family of proteins.

Although the main role of serpins is the inhibition of proteases, they can also perform other functions, such as storage and transport, as well as the regulation of blood pressure.

== Modifications ==
Serpin A12 has three possible glycosylation sites located at asparagine residues. These can be post-translational modifications that may change the protein's properties. Although the protein can undergo these different glycosylation processes, they only diminish heparin affinity. There is no significant effect on KLK7 activity or the protein's thermal stability.

== Related diseases ==
When obesity and insulinemia are present, Serpin A12 is found in very high concentrations. However, these levels decrease with the worsening of diabetes and weight loss.

Administration of Serpin A12 to obese subjects has been seen to improve glucose tolerance and insulin sensitivity, and it also alters the expression of genes associated with insulin resistance.

It is thought that the expression of Serpin A12 could be a mechanism for the compensation of insulin sensitivity and glucose metabolism, as occurs in problems such as obesity or type 2 diabetes.

Despite everything, several studies have shown that not all obese, diabetic, or glucose intolerant patients have detectable Serpin A12 levels.
