= VU0514009 =

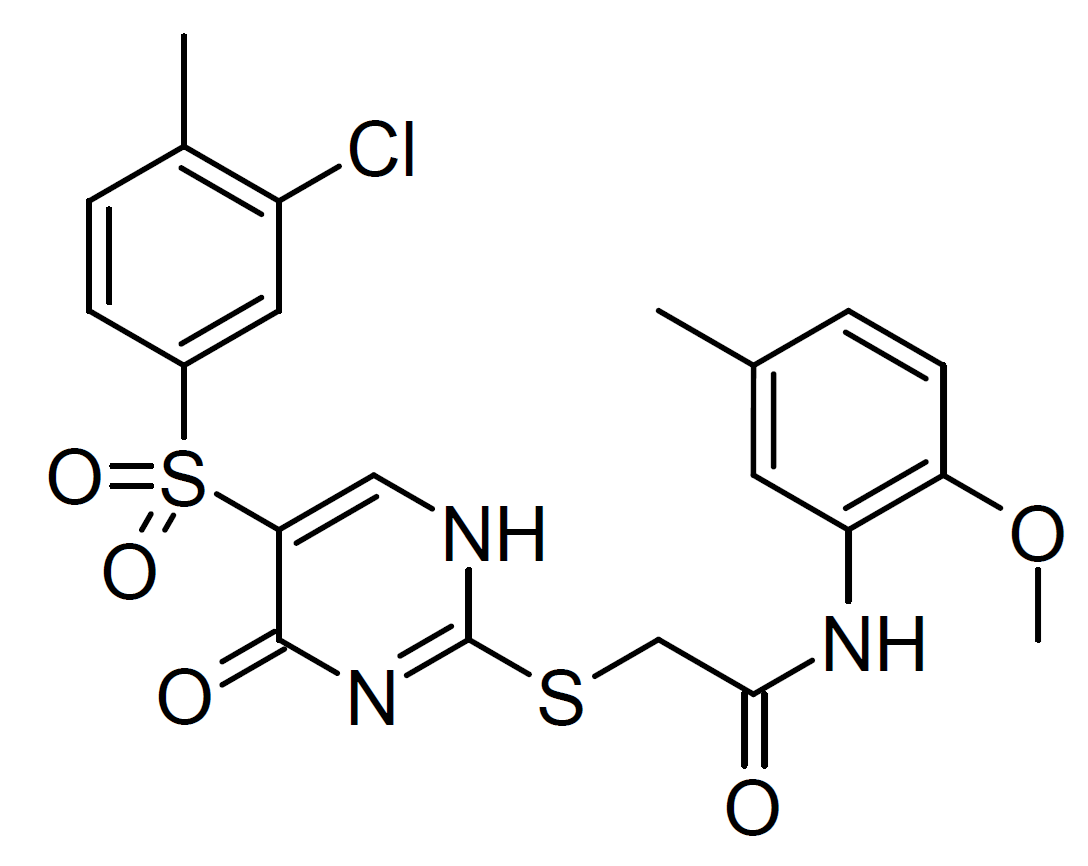

Identifiers
- IUPAC name: 2-{[5-(3-chloro-4-methylbenzenesulfonyl)-6-oxo-1,6-dihydropyrimidin-2-yl]sulfanyl}-N-(2-methoxy-5-methylphenyl)acetamide
- CAS Number: 932973-77-8
- PubChem CID: 16875894
- ChemSpider: 20425435

Chemical and physical data
- Formula: C_{21}H_{20}ClN_{3}O_{5}S_{2}
- Molar mass: 493.98 g·mol^{−1}
- 3D model (JSmol): Interactive image
- SMILES: CC1=CC(=C(C=C1)OC)NC(=O)CSC2=NC=C(C(=O)N2)S(=O)(=O)C3=CC(=C(C=C3)C)Cl
- InChI: InChI=1S/C21H20ClN3O5S2/c1-12-4-7-17(30-3)16(8-12)24-19(26)11-31-21-23-10-18(20(27)25-21)32(28,29)14-6-5-13(2)15(22)9-14/h4-10H,11H2,1-3H3,(H,24,26)(H,23,25,27); Key:UODSZPFBKYQNFN-UHFFFAOYSA-N

VU0514009 is a synthetic drug derived through high-throughput screening which acts as a selective antagonist of the CMKLR1 receptor, though also shows some affinity for the closely related receptor GPR1. It was developed for research into the structure and function of these receptors, and several related compounds have been derived from the initial screening hit.
