= C15 =

C15 or C.XV may refer to:

- Albatros C.XV, a 1918 German military reconnaissance aircraft
- BSA C15, a unit-construction motorcycle manufactured by the Birmingham Small Arms Company between 1959 and 1967
- Coronado C15, a sailboat
- HMS C15, a 1908 British C-class submarine
- Sauber C15, a 1996 racing car
- Citroën C15, a light van
- IEC 60320 C15, a power connector
- The 15th century (1401–1500)
- McDonnell Douglas YC-15
- Esophageal cancer ICD-10 code
- Carbon-15 (C-15 or ^{15}C), an isotope of carbon
- Caldwell 15 (NGC 6826), a planetary nebula in the constellation Cygnus
- A 15-minute Cassette tape, often used to store computer games
- A synthetic chemerin-derived peptide
- The fatty acid pentadecylic acid, whose lipid numbers are C15:0
