= Fetuin =

Blood proteins made in the liver and secreted into the bloodstream

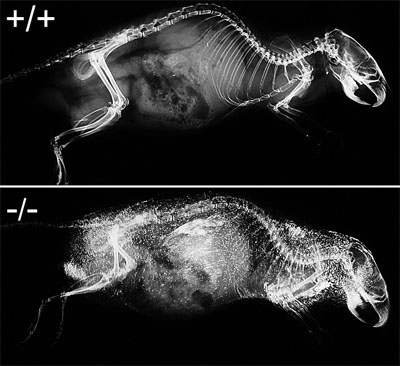
X-ray picture of a Fetuin-A knockout mouse (-/-) compared to a wildtype mouse (+/+). The bright dots in the fetuin-A deficient mouse indicate calcified lesions throughout the body.

Fetuins are blood proteins that are made in the liver and secreted into the bloodstream. They belong to a large group of binding proteins mediating the transport and availability of a wide variety of cargo substances in the bloodstream. Fetuin-A is a major carrier protein of free fatty acids in the circulation. The best known representative of carrier proteins is serum albumin, the most abundant protein in the blood plasma of adult animals. Fetuin is more abundant in fetal blood, hence the name "fetuin" (from Latin, fetus). Fetal bovine serum contains more fetuin than albumin, while adult serum contains more albumin than fetuin.

== Family members ==
Human fetuin is synonymous with α2-HS-glycoprotein (genetic symbol AHSG), α2-HS, A2HS, AHS, HSGA, and fetuin-A. Fetuin-A exists as a single-copy gene in the human and mouse genomes. A closely related gene, fetuin-B, also exists in the human, rat, and mouse genomes. Like fetuin-A, fetuin-B is made predominantly by the liver and to a lesser extent by a number of secretory tissues. Fetuins exist in all vertebrate genomes including fish and reptiles. Fetuins are members of a family of proteins that evolved from the protein cystatin by gene duplication and exchange of gene segments. Fetuins thus belong to the cystatin superfamily of proteins. Fetuin relatives within this superfamily are the histidine-rich glycoprotein (HRG) and kininogen (KNG).

Α2-HS-glycoprotein

Identifiers
- Symbol: AHSG
- Alt. symbols: FETUA, A2HS, HSGA
- NCBI gene: 197
- HGNC: 349
- OMIM: 138680
- RefSeq: NM_001622
- UniProt: P02765

Other data
- Locus: Chr. 3 q27.3
Search for
- Structures: Swiss-model
- Domains: InterPro

fetuin-B

Identifiers
- Symbol: FETUB
- Alt. symbols: 16G2, Gugu
- NCBI gene: 26998
- HGNC: 3658
- OMIM: 605954
- RefSeq: NM_014375
- UniProt: Q9UGM5

Other data
- Locus: Chr. 3 q27.3
Search for
- Structures: Swiss-model
- Domains: InterPro

== Animal studies ==
The function of Fetuin-A in the body was determined by gene knockout technology in mice. Knocking out the gene for fetuin-A rendered the mice completely fetuin-A deficient. Feeding a mineral-rich diet to fetuin-A-deficient mice resulted in widespread calcification (ectopic mineralization) of lung, heart, and kidneys in these mice. The calcification became drastically exacerbated when the fetuin-A knockout was combined with the genetic background DBA/2. The mouse strain DBA/2 is known for its proneness to calcify damaged tissues, a process called "dystrophic calcification". Fetuin-A deficiency dramatically increased the calcification proneness of these mice in that all mice spontaneously calcified throughout their body even without a mineral-rich diet or surgical tissue trauma. Fetuin-A is therefore regarded as a potent inhibitor of systemic calcification.

Free fatty acids cause Fetuin-A overexpression by increasing the pro-inflammatory protein NF-κB. Fetuin-A has been shown to facilitate the binding of free fatty acids to TLR4 receptors, thereby inducing insulin resistance in mice.

== Human studies ==
Fetuin-A was originally discovered to be an inhibitor of vascular calcification in early 1990s. Since then many more roles have been attributed to fetuin-A. Fetuin-A has been demonstrated to play an important role in free fatty acid induced insulin resistance in the liver. Increased fetuin-A in patients with pre-diabetes is associated with increased progression to diabetes and decreased reversal to normoglycemia. Hence fetuin-A is a predictor of adverse glycemic outcomes in pre-diabetes. Obese persons have elevated circulating Fetuin-A, which can be reduced by metformin, exercise, or weight loss. Increased fetuin-A has also been linked to increased occurrence of non-alcoholic fatty liver disease and cardiovascular events, believed to be due to its proinflammatory effects.

Fetuin-A in contrast has also been demonstrated to have anti-inflammatory properties. It is a negative acute-phase reactant in sepsis and endotoxemia, promotes wound healing, and is neuroprotective in Alzheimer's disease. Decreased fetuin-A is a predictor of increased disease activity in obstructive lung disease, Crohn's disease, and ulcerative colitis. Differential effects on different toll like receptors in different tissues and organ systems may explain these paradoxical effects in different systems.
