= Fetuin-B =

Protein-coding gene in the species Homo sapiens

FETUB

Identifiers
- Aliases: FETUB, 16G2, Gugu, IRL685, fetuin B
- External IDs: OMIM: 605954; MGI: 1890221; GeneCards: FETUB

Gene location (Human)
Chr.	Chromosome 3 (human)
Band	3q27.3	Start	186,635,969 bp
Band	3q27.3	End	186,653,141 bp

Gene location (Mouse)
Chr.	Chromosome 16 (mouse)
Band	16 B1|16 13.76 cM	Start	22,737,084 bp
Band	16 B1|16 13.76 cM	End	22,758,528 bp
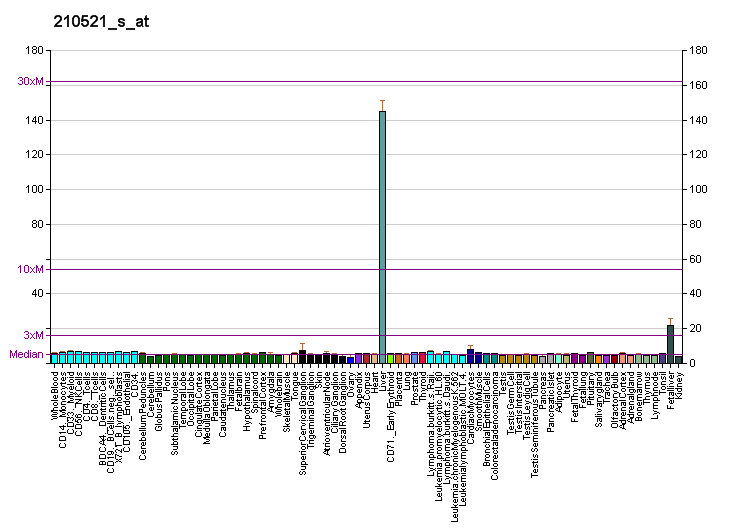
RNA expression pattern
Bgee	Human / Mouse (ortholog); Top expressed in: right lobe of liver; testicle; skin of abdomen; skin of leg; oral cavity; mucosa of pharynx; human penis; vagina; rectum; metanephros / Top expressed in: olfactory epithelium; esophagus; left lobe of liver; zygote; lip; secondary oocyte; primary oocyte; membranous bone; molar; Dermatocranium; More reference expression data
BioGPS	More reference expression data
Gene ontology
Molecular function	peptidase inhibitor activity; enzyme inhibitor activity; cysteine-type endopeptidase inhibitor activity; metalloendopeptidase inhibitor activity; molecular function
Cellular component	extracellular region; extracellular exosome; extracellular space
Biological process	negative regulation of peptidase activity; negative regulation of endopeptidase activity; single fertilization; binding of sperm to zona pellucida; biological process
Sources:Amigo / QuickGO
Orthologs
Databases	NCBI: entry; OMA: entry
Species	Human	Mouse
Entrez	26998	59083
Ensembl	ENSG00000090512	ENSMUSG00000022871
UniProt	Q9UGM5	Q9QXC1
RefSeq (mRNA)	NM_001308077; NM_001308079; NM_014375; NM_001375587; NM_001375588 NM_001375589; NM_001375590; NM_001375591; NM_001375592	NM_001083904; NM_001083905; NM_021564
RefSeq (protein)	NP_001295006; NP_001295008; NP_055190; NP_001362516; NP_001362517 NP_001362518; NP_001362519; NP_001362520; NP_001362521	NP_001077373; NP_001077374; NP_067539
Location (UCSC)	Chr 3: 186.64 – 186.65 Mb	Chr 16: 22.74 – 22.76 Mb
PubMed search
- Wikidata
View/Edit Human	View/Edit Mouse

Fetuin-B is a protein that in humans is encoded by the FETUB gene.

The protein encoded by this gene is a member of the fetuin family, part of the cystatin superfamily of cysteine protease inhibitors. Fetuins have been implicated in several diverse functions, including osteogenesis and bone resorption, regulation of the insulin and hepatocyte growth factor receptors, and response to systemic inflammation. This protein may be secreted by cells.

== See also ==
- Fetuin-A (alpha-2-HS-glycoprotein)
