= 150 =

150 may refer to:

- 150 (number), the natural number following 149 and preceding 151
- AD 150, a year in the 2nd century AD
- 150 BC, a year in the 2nd century BC
- 150 Regiment RLC
- Combined Task Force 150
- 150 Nuwa, a main-belt asteroid
- Chevrolet 150, an economy or fleet car

== See also ==
- List of highways numbered 150
- 150th
