= RARRES1 =

Protein-coding gene in the species Homo sapiens

Identifiers
- Aliases: RARRES1, LXNL, TIG1, PERG-1, retinoic acid receptor responder 1
- External IDs: OMIM: 605090; MGI: 1924461; HomoloGene: 2166; GeneCards: RARRES1; OMA:RARRES1 - orthologs

Gene location (Human)
Chr.	Chromosome 3 (human)
Band	3q25.32	Start	158,696,892 bp
Band	3q25.32	End	158,732,489 bp

Gene location (Mouse)
Chr.	Chromosome 3 (mouse)
Band	3|3 E1	Start	67,386,305 bp
Band	3|3 E1	End	67,422,856 bp
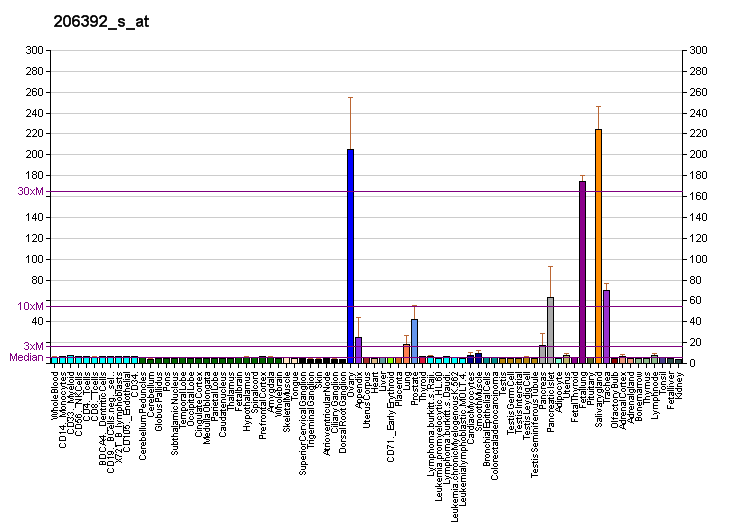

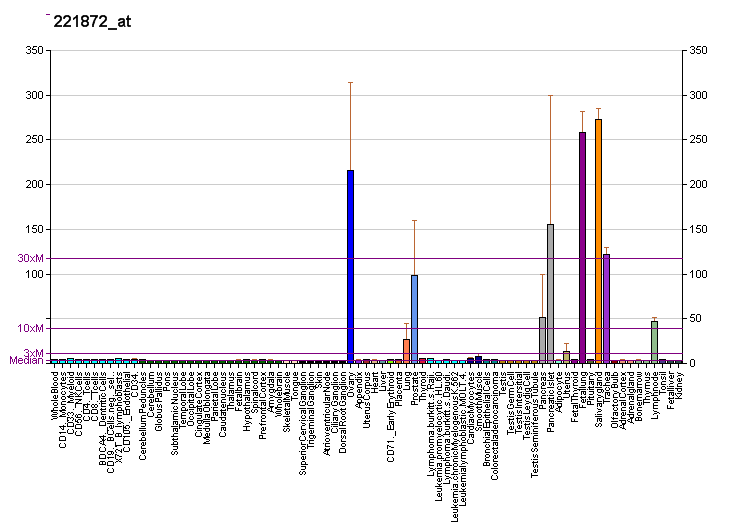

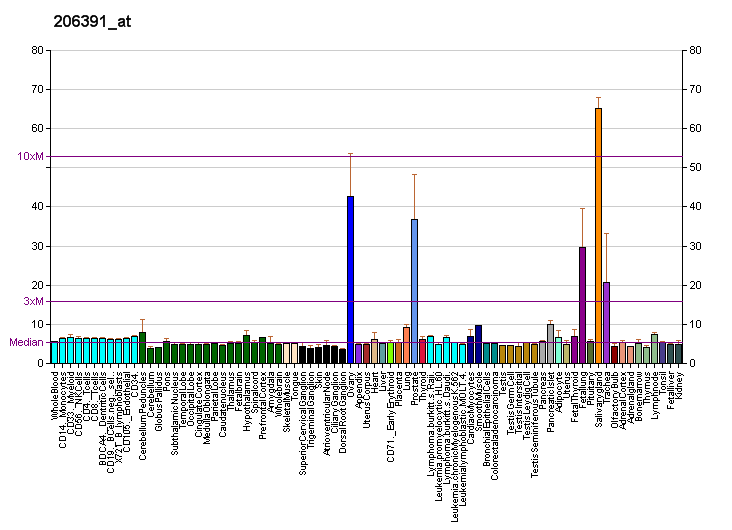
RNA expression pattern
Bgee	Human / Mouse (ortholog); Top expressed in: pericardium; palpebral conjunctiva; olfactory zone of nasal mucosa; left uterine tube; germinal epithelium; nasal epithelium; gastric mucosa; urethra; parietal pleura; tail of epididymis / Top expressed in: lip; skin of external ear; skin of abdomen; lumbar spinal ganglion; left lobe of liver; skin of back; seminal vesicula; embryo; spermatocyte; esophagus; More reference expression data
BioGPS	More reference expression data
Gene ontology
Molecular function	metalloendopeptidase inhibitor activity
Cellular component	integral component of membrane; membrane; extracellular exosome; extracellular space
Biological process	negative regulation of cell population proliferation; negative regulation of endopeptidase activity
Sources:Amigo / QuickGO
Orthologs
Species	Human	Mouse
Entrez	5918	109222
Ensembl	ENSG00000118849	ENSMUSG00000049404
UniProt	P49788	n/a
RefSeq (mRNA)	NM_002888; NM_206963	NM_001164763
RefSeq (protein)	NP_002879; NP_996846	n/a
Location (UCSC)	Chr 3: 158.7 – 158.73 Mb	Chr 3: 67.39 – 67.42 Mb
PubMed search
- Wikidata
View/Edit Human	View/Edit Mouse

Retinoic acid receptor responder protein 1 is a protein that in humans is encoded by the RARRES1 gene.

This gene was identified as a retinoid acid (RA) receptor-responsive gene. It encodes a type 1 membrane protein. The expression of this gene is upregulated by tazarotene as well as by retinoic acid receptors. The expression of this gene is found to be downregulated in prostate cancer, which is caused by the methylation of its promoter and CpG island. Alternatively spliced transcript variant encoding distinct isoforms have been observed.
