= Adipokine =

Type of cytokines secreted by adipose tissue

The adipokines, or adipocytokines (Greek adipo-, fat; cytos-, cell; and -kinos, movement) are a loose collection of hormones, cytokines, growth factors and other cell signaling proteins secreted by adipose tissue. Some contribute to an obesity-related low-grade state of inflammation or to the development of metabolic syndrome, a constellation of diseases including, but not limited to, type 2 diabetes, cardiovascular disease and atherosclerosis. The first adipokine to be discovered was leptin in 1994. Since that time, hundreds of adipokines have been discovered.

Members include:

- Leptin
- Adiponectin
- Apelin
- chemerin
- interleukin-6 (IL-6)
- monocyte chemotactic protein-1 (MCP-1)
- plasminogen activator inhibitor-1 (PAI-1)
- retinol binding protein 4 (RBP4)
- tumor necrosis factor
- visfatin
- omentin
- vaspin (SERPINA12)
- progranulin
- CTRP-4

Interleukin 8 (IL-8), interleukin 10 (IL-10), interferon gamma (IFN-γ) and inducible protein 10 (IP-10 or CXCL10) have been shown to be associated with excessive body weight.

== See also ==
- Adipose tissue
- Hepatokines
- Myokines
