= Alpha-2-HS-glycoprotein =

Protein found in humans

AHSG

Identifiers
- Aliases: AHSG, A2HS, AHS, FETUA, HSGA, alpha-2-HS-glycoprotein, alpha 2-HS glycoprotein
- External IDs: OMIM: 138680; MGI: 107189; GeneCards: AHSG

Gene location (Mouse)
| Chr. | Chromosome 16 (mouse) |
| Band | 16 B1|16 13.74 cM | Start | 22,710,027 bp |
| Band | 16 B1|16 13.74 cM | End | 22,718,199 bp |
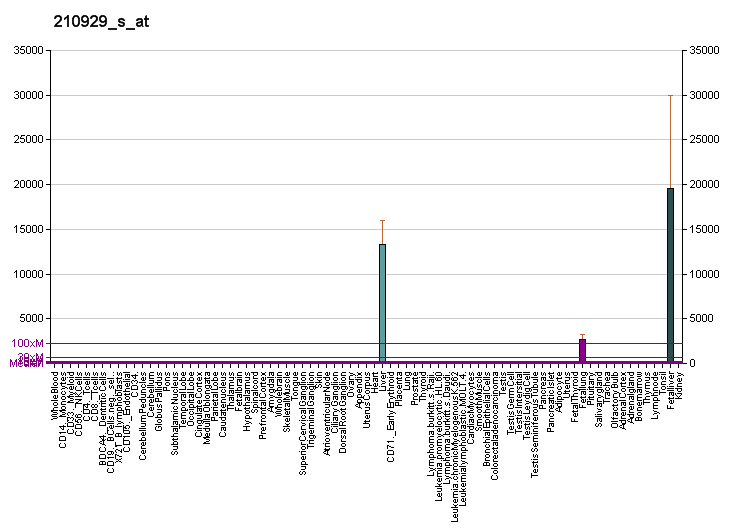

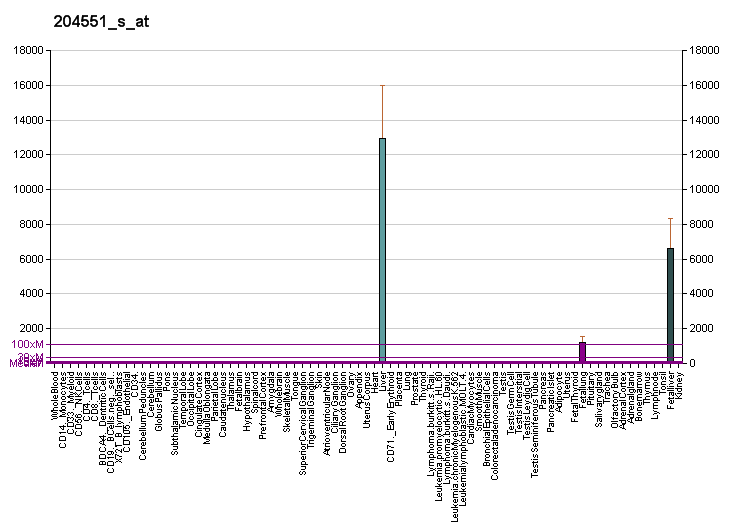
RNA expression pattern
| Bgee | Human / Mouse (ortholog); n/a / Top expressed in: left lobe of liver; gallbladder; fetal liver hematopoietic progenitor cell; human fetus; right atrium; left atrium; sexually immature organism; atrioventricular valve; tongue muscle; morula |
| BioGPS | More reference expression data |
Gene ontology
| Molecular function | endopeptidase inhibitor activity; cysteine-type endopeptidase inhibitor activity; kinase inhibitor activity |
| Cellular component | blood microparticle; extracellular exosome; platelet alpha granule lumen; extracellular space; Golgi apparatus; secretory granule lumen; endoplasmic reticulum lumen; extracellular matrix; extracellular region; collagen-containing extracellular matrix |
| Biological process | regulation of bone mineralization; negative regulation of biomineral tissue development; skeletal system development; negative regulation of insulin receptor signaling pathway; positive regulation of phagocytosis; pinocytosis; negative regulation of bone mineralization; acute-phase response; ossification; regulation of inflammatory response; negative regulation of phosphorylation; platelet degranulation; negative regulation of endopeptidase activity; neutrophil degranulation; post-translational protein modification; negative regulation of kinase activity |
Sources:Amigo / QuickGO
Orthologs
| Databases | NCBI: entry; OMA: entry |
| Species | Human | Mouse |
| Entrez | 197 | 11625 |
| Ensembl | ENSG00000145192 | ENSMUSG00000022868 |
| UniProt | P02765 | P29699 |
| RefSeq (mRNA) | NM_001622 | NM_001276449; NM_001276450; NM_013465 |
| RefSeq (protein) | NP_001613; NP_001341500; NP_001341501; NP_001341502 | NP_001263378; NP_001263379; NP_038493 |
| Location (UCSC) | n/a | Chr 16: 22.71 – 22.72 Mb |
| PubMed search |
- Wikidata
| View/Edit Human | View/Edit Mouse |

alpha-2-HS-glycoprotein (AHSG, Alpha-2-Heremans-Schmid Glycoprotein) also known as fetuin-A is a protein that in humans is encoded by the AHSG gene. Fetuin-A belongs to the fetuin class of plasma binding proteins and is more abundant in fetal than adult blood.

== Function ==
Alpha2-HS glycoprotein, a glycoprotein present in the serum, is synthesized by hepatocytes and adipocytes. The AHSG molecule consists of two polypeptide chains, which are both cleaved from a proprotein encoded from a single mRNA. It is involved in several functions, such as endocytosis, brain development and the formation of bone tissue. The protein is commonly present in the cortical plate of the immature cerebral cortex and bone marrow hemopoietic matrix, and it has therefore been postulated that it participates in the development of the tissues. However, its exact significance is still obscure.

The choroid plexus is an established extrahepatic expression site. The mature circulating AHSG molecule consists of two polypeptide chains, which are both cleaved from a proprotein encoded from a single mRNA. Multiple post-translational modifications have been reported. Thus AHSG is a secreted partially phosphorylated glycoprotein with complex proteolytic processing that circulates in blood and extracellular fluids. In the test tube AHSG can bind multiple ligands and therefore has been claimed to be involved in several functions, such as endocytosis, brain development and the formation of bone tissue. Most of these functions await confirmation in vivo.

== Clinical significance ==
Fetuins are carrier proteins like albumin. Fetuin-A forms soluble complexes with calcium and phosphate and thus is a carrier of otherwise insoluble calcium phosphate. Thus fetuin-A is a potent inhibitor of pathological calcification, in particular Calciphylaxis. Mice deficient in fetuin-A show systemic calcification of soft tissues. Fetuin-A can inhibit calcification, and inhibits osteogenesis in bone. Fetuin-A appears to promote calcification in coronary artery disease, but oppose calcification in peripheral artery disease.

High levels of Fetuin-A are associated with obesity and insulin resistance. Fetuin-A promotes insulin resistance by enhancing the binding of free fatty acids to TLR4. In adipose tissue, Fetuin-A downregulates the expression of adiponectin, thereby increasing inflammation and insulin resistance. Also in adipose tissue, Fetuin-A reduces lipogenesis and increases lipolysis, thereby increasing obesity and insulin resistance.

Supervised exercise (that is not associated with weight reduction) reduces Fetuin-A.

== See also ==
- Fetuin-B
