= Adropin =

Peptide hormone

ENHO

Identifiers
- Aliases: ENHO, C9orf165, UNQ470, energy homeostasis associated, Adropin, IPR034461
- External IDs: MGI: 1916888; GeneCards: ENHO

Gene location (Human)
Chr.	Chromosome 9 (human)
Band	9p13.3	Start	34,521,043 bp
Band	9p13.3	End	34,522,990 bp

Gene location (Mouse)
Chr.	Chromosome 4 (mouse)
Band	4|4 A5	Start	41,638,144 bp
Band	4|4 A5	End	41,640,324 bp
RNA expression pattern
Bgee	Human / Mouse (ortholog); Top expressed in: amygdala; putamen; right frontal lobe; nucleus accumbens; caudate nucleus; cingulate gyrus; hypothalamus; anterior cingulate cortex; Brodmann area 9; substantia nigra / Top expressed in: otolith organ; utricle; islet of Langerhans; dorsal tegmental nucleus; deep cerebellar nuclei; medial vestibular nucleus; facial motor nucleus; pontine nuclei; anterior horn of spinal cord; medial dorsal nucleus; More reference expression data
BioGPS	n/a
Gene ontology
Molecular function	hormone activity
Cellular component	extracellular region; plasma membrane
Biological process	positive regulation of Notch signaling pathway; insulin receptor signaling pathway; lipid biosynthetic process; regulation of signaling receptor activity; insulin secretion; glucose homeostasis; positive regulation of lipid biosynthetic process; positive regulation of oxidoreductase activity; positive regulation of RNA polymerase II regulatory region sequence-specific DNA binding; positive regulation of macromolecule metabolic process; macromolecule metabolic process; signal transduction; negative regulation of insulin receptor signaling pathway; negative regulation of insulin secretion; negative regulation of lipid biosynthetic process; negative regulation of RNA polymerase II regulatory region sequence-specific DNA binding
Sources:Amigo / QuickGO
Orthologs
Databases	NCBI: entry; OMA: entry
Species	Human	Mouse
Entrez	375704	69638
Ensembl	ENSG00000168913	ENSMUSG00000028445
UniProt	Q6UWT2	Q8K1D8
RefSeq (mRNA)	NM_198573	NM_027147
RefSeq (protein)	NP_940975	NP_081423
Location (UCSC)	Chr 9: 34.52 – 34.52 Mb	Chr 4: 41.64 – 41.64 Mb
PubMed search
- Wikidata
View/Edit Human	View/Edit Mouse

Adropin is a protein encoded by the energy homeostasis-associated gene ENHO in humans and is highly conserved across mammals.

The biological role of adropin was first described in mice by Andrew Butler's team. They identified it as a protein hormone (hepatokine) secreted from the liver, playing a role in obesity and energy homeostasis. The name "Adropin" is derived from the Latin words "aduro" (to set fire to) and "pinguis" (fat). Adropin is produced in various tissues, including the liver, brain, heart, and gastrointestinal tract.

In animals, adropin regulates carbohydrate and lipid metabolism and influences endothelial function. Its expression in the liver is controlled by feeding status, macronutrient content, as well as by the biological clock. Liver adropin is upregulated by estrogen via the estrogen receptor alpha (ERα).

In humans, lower levels of circulating adropin are linked to several medical conditions, including the metabolic syndrome, obesity, and inflammatory bowel disease. and inflammatory bowel disease. The brain exhibits the highest levels of adropin expression, In the brain, adropin has been shown to have a potential protective role against neurological disease, where it may play a protective role against neurological diseases, brain aging, cognitive decline, and acute ischemia. as well as following acute ischemia.

The orphan G protein-coupled receptor GPR19 has been proposed as a receptor for adropin.

== Structure ==
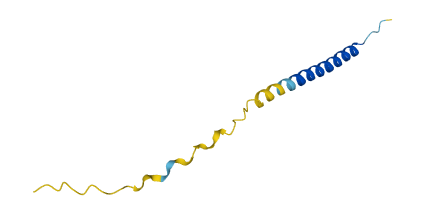
Predicted structure of Adropin (AlphaFold)

Adropin is a small protein composed of 76 amino acids, and it is produced primarily in the liver and the brain. The precursor of adropin is a larger protein called Energy Homeostasis-Associated (ENHO), and adropin is released through the cleavage of ENHO.

== Receptors and targets ==
The specific receptors for adropin are not yet fully elucidated, and this is an area of active research. However, studies suggest that adropin might exert its effects by interacting with certain cell surface receptors.

== Function ==
=== Metabolic ===
One of the primary areas of interest regarding adropin is its role in metabolic regulation. Research indicates that adropin may play a crucial role in glucose and lipid metabolism. It has been associated with insulin sensitivity, suggesting a potential role in the regulation of blood sugar levels.

In animal studies, alterations in adropin levels have been linked to changes in energy expenditure and body weight. For example, some studies have shown that mice with elevated adropin levels tend to be more resistant to diet-induced obesity.

A study in humans demonstrated that changes in vascular insulin resistance following short-term adverse lifestyle changes were associated with a decrease in plasma adropin in men but not women, perhaps related to adropin's regulation by estrogen.

=== Cardiovascular ===
Adropin also appears to have cardiovascular effects. It has been implicated in the regulation of endothelial function, which is essential for maintaining blood vessel health. Dysfunction in endothelial cells can contribute to conditions such as atherosclerosis and hypertension. Some studies suggest that adropin may have a protective role in cardiovascular health by promoting the dilation of blood vessels and reducing oxidative stress.

In mice, adropin regulates cardiac energy metabolism and improves cardiac function and efficiency. In rats, adropin treatment alleviated diabetes related myocardial fibrosis and diastolic dysfunction, and enhanced the therapeutic potential of mesenchymal stem cells in myocardial infarction.

=== Central nervous system ===
Adropin is produced in the brain, particularly in the hypothalamus. The hypothalamus is a crucial region for the regulation of various physiological processes, including metabolism and energy balance. The presence of adropin in the brain suggests that it may have additional roles in the central nervous system, although the specifics are still being explored.

=== Circadian rhythm ===
There is evidence to suggest that adropin levels exhibit a circadian rhythm, meaning they follow a natural 24-hour cycle. Circadian rhythms play a vital role in regulating various physiological processes, including sleep-wake cycles, hormone secretion, and metabolism.

=== Gonads and sexual development ===
In mice, adropin treatment significantly increased sperm count and testicular testosterone by increasing expression of GPR19 and steroidogenic proteins via modulating redox potential. In the mouse ovary, adropin and GPR19 are strongly detected in the granulosa cells of large antral follicles and corpus luteum. An additional study suggests a role for adropin in the acceleration of pubertal development.

== Clinical significance ==
Given its involvement in metabolic and cardiovascular processes, adropin has sparked interest as a potential biomarker and therapeutic target for conditions such as obesity, diabetes, and cardiovascular disease. However, much more research is needed to understand the precise mechanisms of adropin action and its potential applications in clinical settings.

=== Systemic sclerosis ===
Adropin is a repressor of fibroblast activation and is dysregulated in patients with Systemic sclerosis. Adropin showed antifibrotic activity in mouse models of skin and lung fibrosis as well as in human skin biopsies. Thus, adropin is a potential therapeutic target in tissue fibrosis.
