= Penitanzacid F =

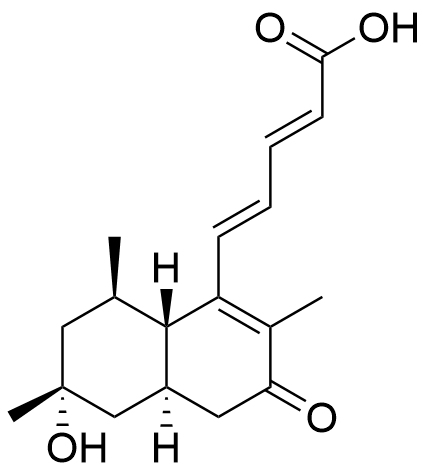

Names
- Preferred IUPAC name (2E,4E)-5-((4aR,6R,8R,8aS)-6-hydroxy-2,6,8-trimethyl-3-oxo-3,4,4a,5,6,7,8,8a-octahydronaphthalen-1-yl)penta-2,4-dienoic acid

Identifiers
3D model (JSmol)	Interactive image
- InChI: InChI=1S/C18H24O4/c1-11-9-18(3,22)10-13-8-15(19)12(2)14(17(11)13)6-4-5-7-16(20)21/h4-7,11,13,17,22H,8-10H2,1-3H3,(H,20,21)/b6-4+,7-5+/t11-,13+,17+,18-/m1/s1
- SMILES: OC(/C=C/C=C/C([C@@]1([C@]([H])(C[C@](O)(C[C@H]1C)C)CC2=O)[H])=C2C)=O

Properties
Chemical formula	C_{18}H_{24}O_{4}
Molar mass	304.39 g·mol^{−1}
- Except where otherwise noted, data are given for materials in their standard state (at 25 °C [77 °F], 100 kPa). Infobox references

Penitanzacid F was found as one of the twelve new tanzawaic acid derivatives, which were the secondary metabolites of the fungi Pencillum sp. KWF32 isolated from the tissues of Bathymodiolus sp. collected in the cold spring area of the South China Sea in 2021.

It may have anticoccidial, cytotoxic, lipid-lowering, superoxide anion production inhibiting, bacterial conjugation inhibiting, and NO production inhibiting properties as a tanzawaic acid derivative.

== Structure and biosynthesis ==
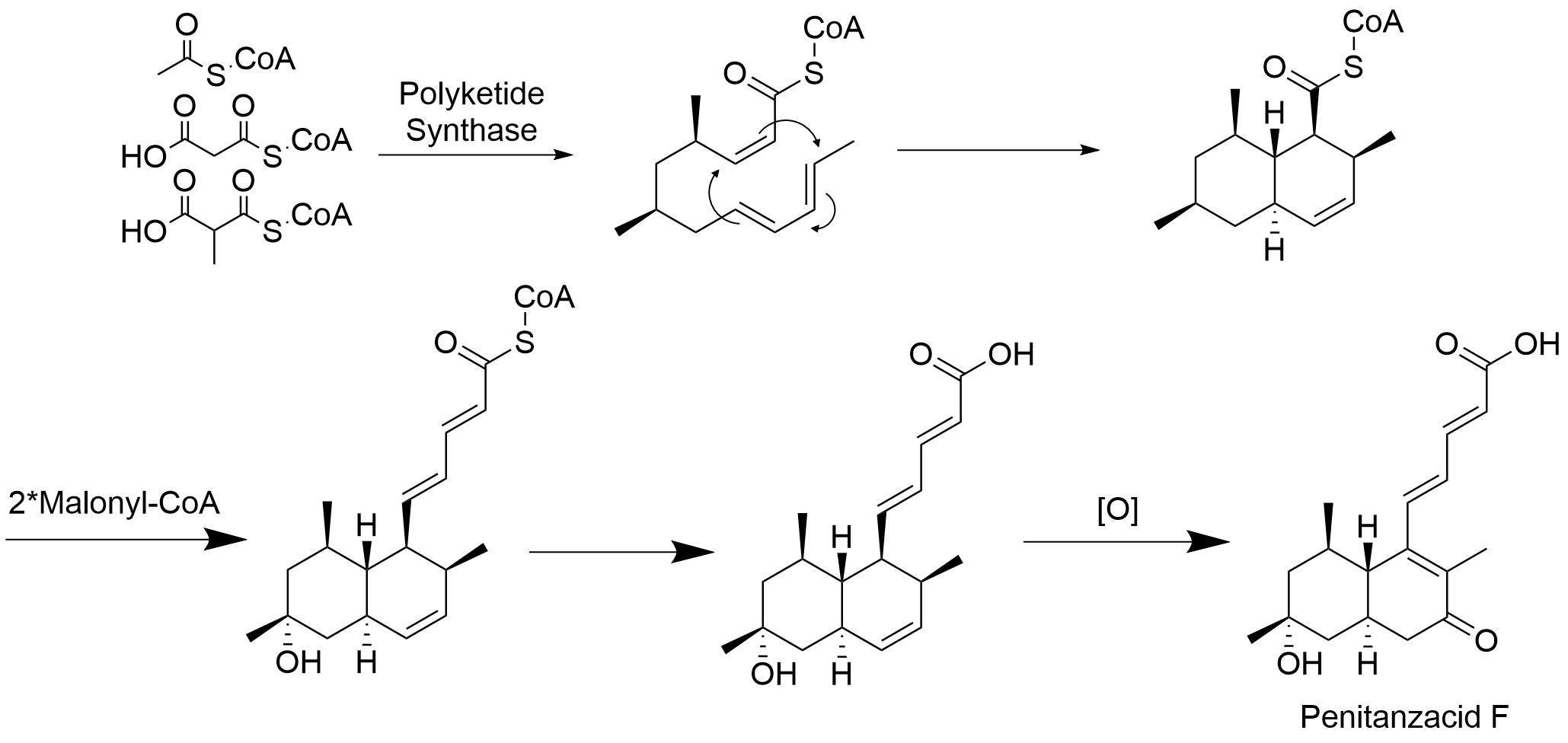
The biosynthesis of Penitanzacid F starts from one acetyl-CoA, two methylmalonyl-CoA and three malonyl-CoA molecules with polyketide synthase (PKS). Then the product undergoes Diels-Alder Cyclization, chain elongation with two malonyl-CoA, and is oxidized to penitanzaicacid F.
