= Olympus C-150 =

C-150
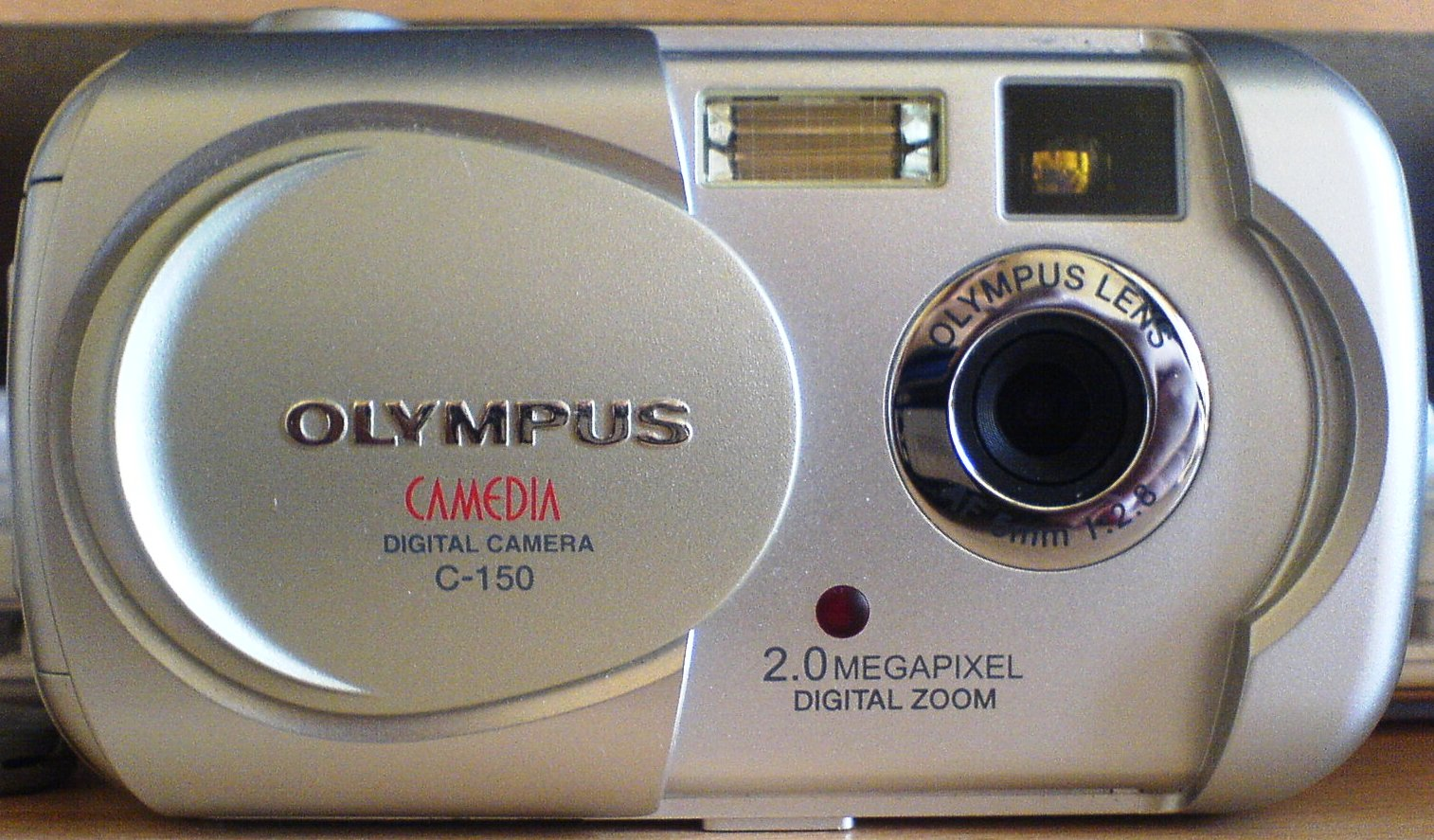

Overview
- Maker: Olympus Optical Co. Ltd.
- Type: Still image camera with motion capability

Lens
- Lens: Permanently attached lens; 2x digital zoom
- F-numbers: 2.8

Sensor/medium
- Sensor type: Digital CCD
- Sensor size: 2 effective megapixel
- Recording medium: xD Picture Card

Focusing
- Focus: Automatic

Shutter
- Shutter speeds: 1/2 to 1/700 seconds

The Olympus C-150 (also known as D-390) is an entry-level digital camera from Olympus. It works as a standard USB storage device, and uses xD-Picture Cards for storage.
