= C1QTNF4 =

Protein-coding gene in the species Homo sapiens

Identifiers
- Aliases: C1QTNF4, CTRP4, ZACRP4, C1q and tumor necrosis factor related protein 4, C1q and TNF related 4
- External IDs: OMIM: 614911; MGI: 1914695; GeneCards: C1QTNF4

Gene location (Human)
Chr.	Chromosome 11 (human)
Band	11p11.2	Start	47,589,667 bp
Band	11p11.2	End	47,594,411 bp

Gene location (Mouse)
Chr.	Chromosome 2 (mouse)
Band	2|2 E1	Start	90,716,204 bp
Band	2|2 E1	End	90,720,869 bp
RNA expression pattern
Bgee	Human / Mouse (ortholog); Top expressed in: primary visual cortex; superior frontal gyrus; nucleus accumbens; putamen; caudate nucleus; Brodmann area 9; right frontal lobe; right hemisphere of cerebellum; anterior cingulate cortex; temporal lobe / Top expressed in: striatum of neuraxis; superior frontal gyrus; primary visual cortex; olfactory bulb; hippocampus proper; spermatid; cerebellar cortex; spermatocyte; testicle; neural tube; More reference expression data
BioGPS	n/a
Gene ontology
Molecular function	cytokine activity; molecular function
Cellular component	extracellular region; extracellular space
Biological process	regulation of signaling receptor activity; positive regulation of interleukin-6 production; positive regulation of interleukin-6-mediated signaling pathway; positive regulation of NIK/NF-kappaB signaling; signal transduction
Sources:Amigo / QuickGO
Orthologs
Databases	NCBI: entry; OMA: entry
Species	Human	Mouse
Entrez	114900	67445
Ensembl	ENSG00000172247; ENSG00000284838	ENSMUSG00000040794
UniProt	Q9BXJ3	Q8R066
RefSeq (mRNA)	NM_031909	NM_026161
RefSeq (protein)	NP_114115	NP_080437
Location (UCSC)	Chr 11: 47.59 – 47.59 Mb	Chr 2: 90.72 – 90.72 Mb
PubMed search
- Wikidata
View/Edit Human	View/Edit Mouse

C1q and tumor necrosis factor related protein 4 is a protein that in humans is encoded by the C1QTNF4 gene (also called CTRP4). C1QTNF4 is a secreted protein that increases cytokine production and signaling effectiveness.
