= Navamepent =

Experimental anti-inflammatory compound

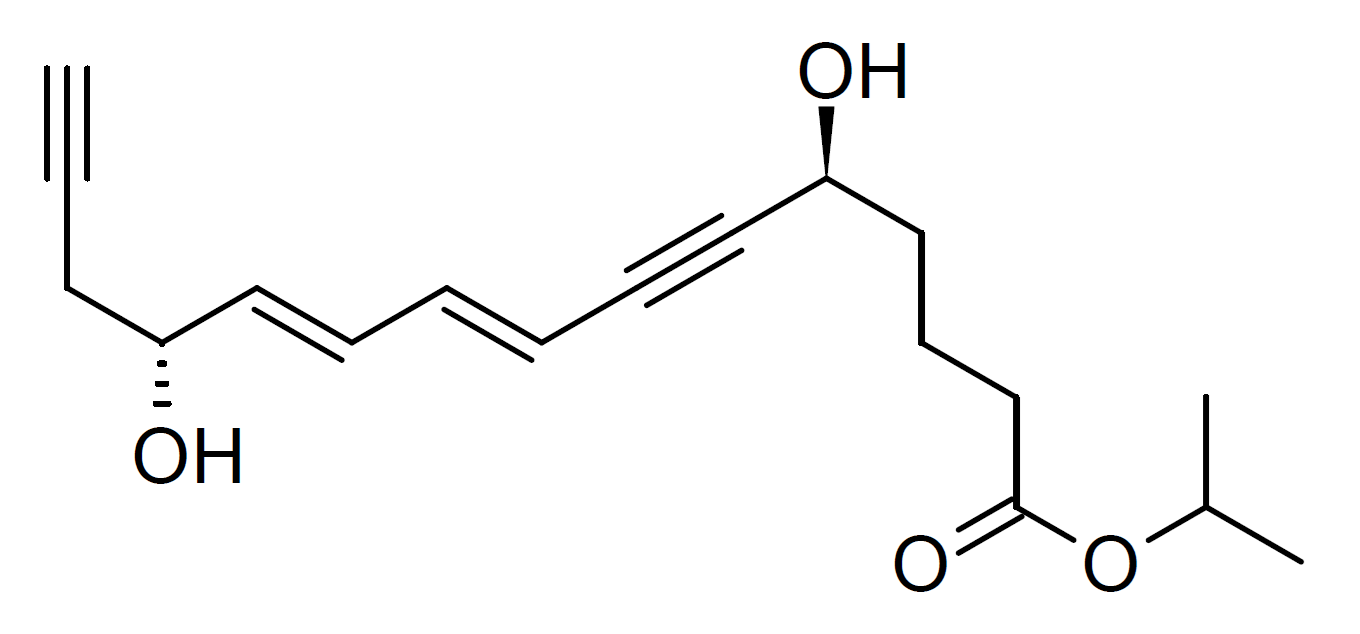

Clinical data
- Other names: RX-10045

Identifiers
- IUPAC name: propan-2-yl (5S,8E,10E,12R)-5,12-dihydroxypentadeca-8,10-dien-6,14-diynoate
- CAS Number: 1251537-11-7
- PubChem CID: 46926878
- IUPHAR/BPS: 9463
- ChemSpider: 57490355
- UNII: Q7789B8MWM
- ChEMBL: ChEMBL5314965

Chemical and physical data
- Formula: C_{18}H_{24}O_{4}
- Molar mass: 304.386 g·mol^{−1}
- 3D model (JSmol): Interactive image
- SMILES: CC(C)OC(=O)CCC[C@@H](C#C/C=C/C=C/[C@@H](CC#C)O)O
- InChI: InChI=1S/C18H24O4/c1-4-10-16(19)11-7-5-6-8-12-17(20)13-9-14-18(21)22-15(2)3/h1,5-7,11,15-17,19-20H,9-10,13-14H2,2-3H3/b6-5+,11-7+/t16-,17-/m1/s1; Key:ZVOCIIHCJJEFRQ-BHXBHYJPSA-N

Navamepent (RX-10045) is a synthetic analogue of the endogenous fatty acid resolvin E1, a member of the specialized pro-resolving mediators. Navamepent is presumed to act as an agonist of the CMKLR1 receptor in a manner similar to resolvin E1.

It was developed as a topical ophthalmic formulation to promote recovery from eye inflammation and advanced to Phase II clinical trials, but was not pursued further.
