= Retinol binding protein 4 =

Protein found in humans

RBP4
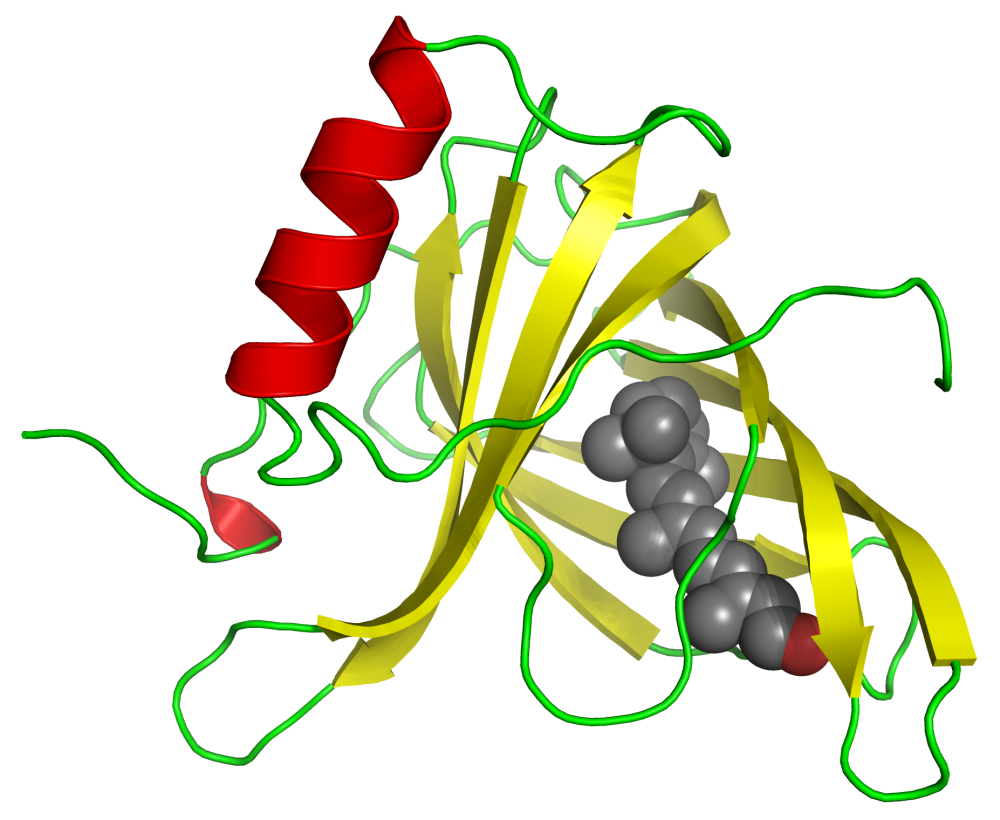

Identifiers
- Aliases: RBP4, MCOPCB10, RDCCAS, retinol binding protein 4
- External IDs: OMIM: 180250; MGI: 97879; GeneCards: RBP4
Available structures
PDB	Ortholog search: PDBe RCSB
PDB	List of PDB id codes 1BRP, 1BRQ, 1JYD, 1JYJ, 1QAB, 1RBP, 1RLB, 2WQ9, 2WQA, 2WR6, 3BSZ, 3FMZ, 4O9S, 4PSQ

Gene location (Human)
Chr.	Chromosome 10 (human)
Band	10q23.33	Start	93,591,687 bp
Band	10q23.33	End	93,601,744 bp

Gene location (Mouse)
Chr.	Chromosome 19 (mouse)
Band	19 C2|19 32.75 cM	Start	38,105,077 bp
Band	19 C2|19 32.75 cM	End	38,113,729 bp
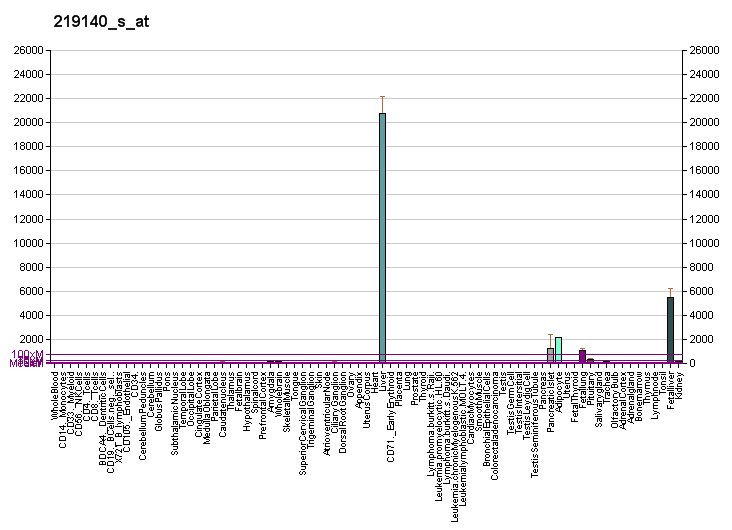
RNA expression pattern
Bgee	Human / Mouse (ortholog); Top expressed in: right lobe of liver; beta cell; subcutaneous adipose tissue; pituitary gland; anterior pituitary; abdominal fat; skin of hip; tibia; synovial joint; decidua / Top expressed in: left lobe of liver; yolk sac; gallbladder; white adipose tissue; brown adipose tissue; fetal liver hematopoietic progenitor cell; tunica adventitia of aorta; human fetus; lactiferous gland; tunica media of zone of aorta; More reference expression data
BioGPS	More reference expression data
Gene ontology
Molecular function	retinol transmembrane transporter activity; transporter activity; protein binding; retinoid binding; protein heterodimerization activity; retinol binding; retinal binding; small molecule binding
Cellular component	cytosol; extracellular region; extracellular exosome; extracellular space; protein-containing complex
Biological process	eye development; gluconeogenesis; heart trabecula formation; response to retinoic acid; glucose homeostasis; response to stimulus; cardiac muscle tissue development; lung development; vagina development; urinary bladder development; retinol metabolic process; embryonic organ morphogenesis; embryonic skeletal system development; retinoid metabolic process; female genitalia morphogenesis; uterus development; development of the heart; maintenance of gastrointestinal epithelium; retinol transport; embryonic retina morphogenesis in camera-type eye; response to ethanol; negative regulation of cardiac muscle cell proliferation; visual perception; positive regulation of insulin secretion; transport
Sources:Amigo / QuickGO
Orthologs
Databases	NCBI: entry; OMA: entry
Species	Human	Mouse
Entrez	5950	19662
Ensembl	ENSG00000138207	ENSMUSG00000024990
UniProt	P02753	Q00724
RefSeq (mRNA)	NM_006744; NM_001323517; NM_001323518	NM_001159487; NM_011255
RefSeq (protein)	NP_001310446; NP_001310447; NP_006735	NP_001152959; NP_035385
Location (UCSC)	Chr 10: 93.59 – 93.6 Mb	Chr 19: 38.11 – 38.11 Mb
PubMed search
- Wikidata
View/Edit Human	View/Edit Mouse

Retinol binding protein 4, also known as RBP4, is a transporter protein for retinol (vitamin A alcohol). RBP4 has a molecular weight of approximately 21 kDa and is encoded by the RBP4 gene in humans. It is mainly, though not exclusively, synthesized in the liver and circulates in the bloodstream as a hepatokine bound to retinol in a complex with transthyretin. RBP4 has been a drug target for ophthalmology research due to its role in vision. RBP4 may also be involved in metabolic diseases as suggested by recent studies.

== Function ==
This protein belongs to the lipocalin family and is the specific carrier for retinol (vitamin A) in the blood. It delivers retinol from the liver stores to the peripheral tissues. In plasma, the RBP-retinol complex interacts with transthyretin, which prevents its loss by filtration through the kidney glomeruli. A deficiency of vitamin A blocks secretion of the binding protein posttranslationally and results in defective delivery and supply to the epidermal cells.

== Structure ==
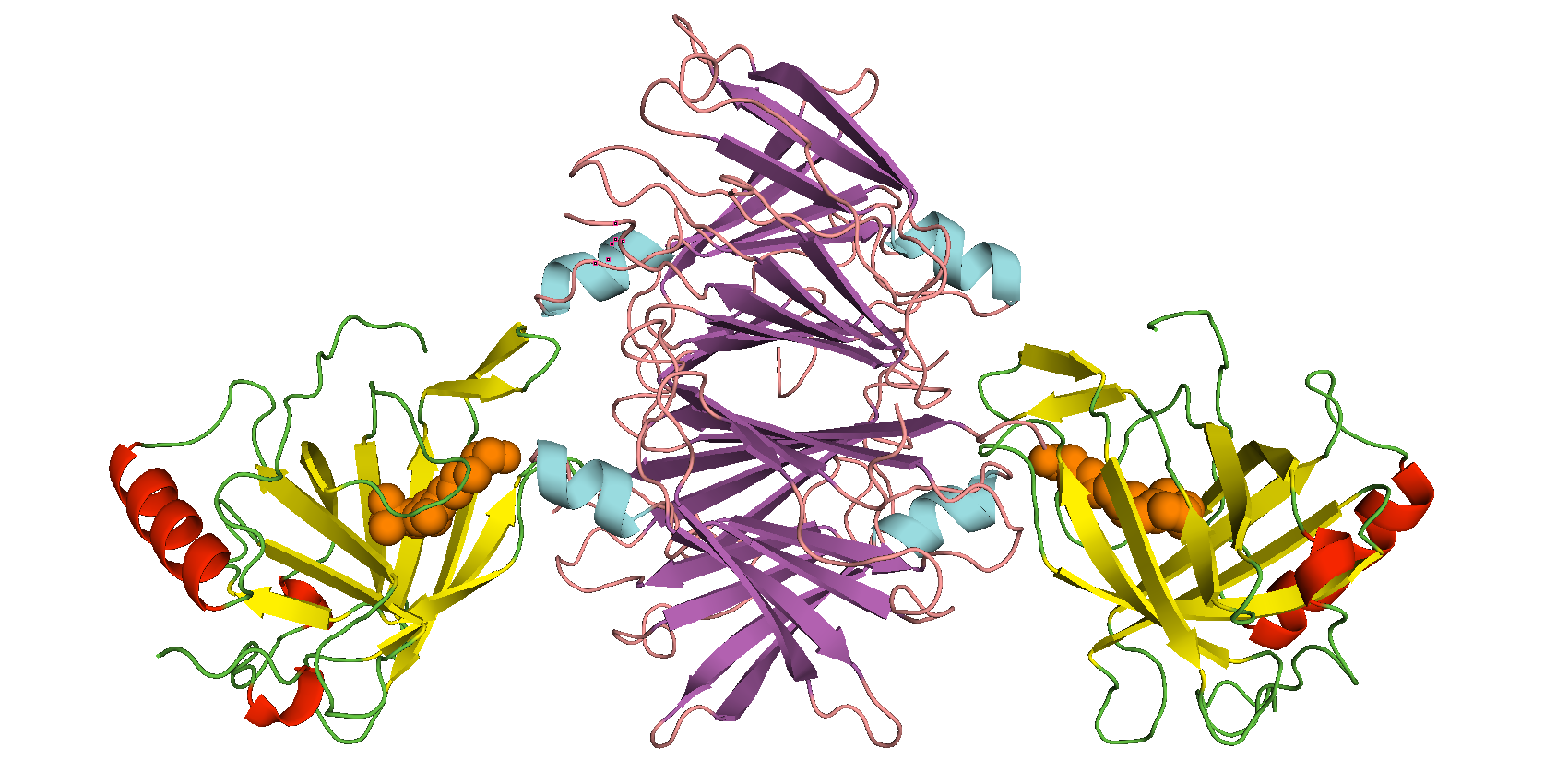
Two molecules of RBP4 (in yellow and red) bound to retinol (in orange) complexed with four molecules of TTR (in purple and blue)

RBP4 is a single polypeptide chain with a hydrophobic pocket where retinol binds. The RBP4-retinol complex then binds transthyretin in circulation to prevent renal filtration of RBP4.

In serum, TTR and RBP4 bind in a 1 to 1 stoichiometry (two molecules of TTR combine with two molecules of RBP4 to form a complex with a total molecular weight of approximately 80,000 daltons).

== Clinical significance ==
Retinol-binding protein 4 has been a drug target for eye diseases as RBP4 is the sole carrier for retinol, which is an essential nutrient for the visual cycle. Animal studies using RBP4-antagonists showed that lowering RBP4 can lead to reduction in the accumulation of lipofuscin that leads to vision loss in eye diseases like Stargardt's disease and macular degeneration. An animal study using ABCA4 knockout mouse proved that reduction in serum RBP4 level could inhibit lipofuscin without inhibiting the visual cycle.[ref] One clinical study in age-related macular degeneration (AMD) was conducted using Fenretinide. The study showed trends in reducing lesion growth rate in AMD and rate of conversion from early stage AMD (dry AMD) to late stage AMD (wet AMD) without serious side effects.

RBP4 has recently been described as an adipokine that contributes to insulin resistance and diabetes in the AG4KO mouse model. In addition to the liver, RBP4 is also secreted by adipocytes of the fat tissue in a smaller portion and acts as a signal to surrounding cells, when there is a decrease in plasma glucose concentration. It is suspected that an elevated level of RBP4 attracts macrophages to the fat tissue, causes local inflammation, and leads to insulin resistance.

Mutations in the RBP4 gene have recently been linked to a form of autosomal dominant microphthalmia, anophthalmia, and coloboma (MAC) disease. A unique feature of this disease is the maternal inheritance effect, when a fetus inherits a mutated copy of the RBP4 gene from its mother, but not from its father. The physiologic basis lies in pregnancy whereby the mutated gene product, retinol binding protein (RBP), has negative effects in transferring vitamin A from maternal liver storage sites to the placenta, and then again on the fetal circulation side when delivering vitamin A from the placenta to developing fetal tissues, most notably the developing eye. This 'double whammy' effect does not exist when the mutant RBP4 gene is inherited from the father. The above mechanism is separate from previously known types of maternal inheritance effects such as genomic imprinting, mitochondrial inheritance, or maternal oocyte mRNA transfer. The authors of the above study cite the potential of vitamin A supplementation in pregnant females who are known to carry an RBP4 mutation with retinyl ester which utilizes an RBP-independent pathway to deliver retinoids from the maternal intestines directly to the placenta and ultimately is uptaken by the fetus. The key would be to supplement during the first several months of life when the eye begins to develop, as supplementing later in pregnancy would be too late to avoid any potential MAC disease.

== See also ==
- Retinol
- Adipokine
- Transthyretin (TTR)
