= PLAAT4 =

Protein-coding gene in humans

Identifiers
- Aliases: PLAAT4, HRASLS4, HRSL4, PLA1/2-3, RIG1, TIG3, retinoic acid receptor responder 3, PLAAT-4, RARRES3, phospholipase A and acyltransferase 4
- External IDs: OMIM: 605092; GeneCards: PLAAT4
Available structures
PDB	Human UniProt search: PDBe RCSB
PDB	List of PDB id codes 2LKT, 2MY9
Enzyme activity
EC #	BRENDA	ExPASy	KEGG	MetaCyc
3.1.1.4	↗	↗	↗	↗
3.1.1.32	↗	↗	↗	↗

Gene location (Human)
Chr.	Chromosome 11 (human)
Band	11q12.3	Start	63,536,808 bp
Band	11q12.3	End	63,546,462 bp
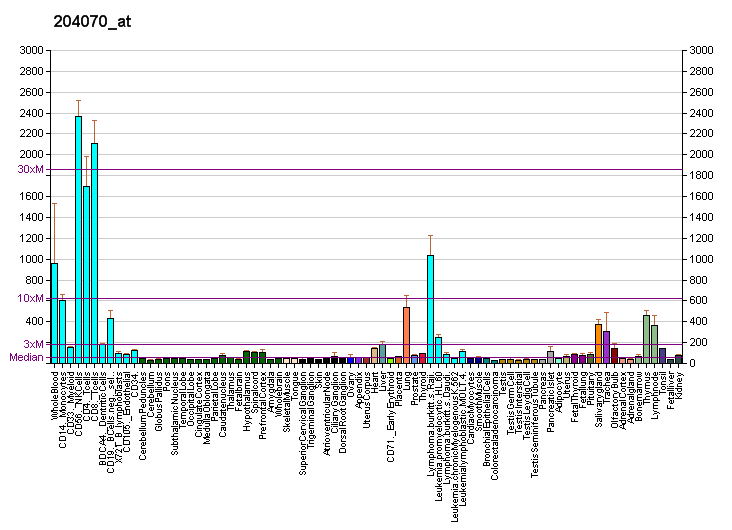
RNA expression pattern
Bgee	Human / Mouse (ortholog); Top expressed in: granulocyte; nasal epithelium; olfactory zone of nasal mucosa; palpebral conjunctiva; epithelium of bronchus; bronchial epithelial cell; upper lobe of left lung; right uterine tube; lymph node; right lung / n/a; More reference expression data
BioGPS	More reference expression data
Gene ontology
Molecular function	protein binding; hydrolase activity; phospholipase A2 activity; acyltransferase activity; phospholipase A1 activity; N-acyltransferase activity; phosphatidylserine 1-acylhydrolase activity; 1-acyl-2-lysophosphatidylserine acylhydrolase activity
Cellular component	integral component of membrane; membrane; cytosol
Biological process	lipid catabolic process; lipid metabolism; negative regulation of cell population proliferation; phospholipid metabolic process; phosphatidylethanolamine acyl-chain remodeling; N-acylphosphatidylethanolamine metabolic process; positive regulation of keratinocyte differentiation; positive regulation of protein-glutamine gamma-glutamyltransferase activity
Sources:Amigo / QuickGO
Orthologs
Databases	NCBI: entry; OMA: entry
Species	Human	Mouse
Entrez	5920	n/a
Ensembl	ENSG00000133321	n/a
UniProt	Q9UL19	n/a
RefSeq (mRNA)	NM_004585	n/a
RefSeq (protein)	NP_004576	n/a
Location (UCSC)	Chr 11: 63.54 – 63.55 Mb	n/a
PubMed search		n/a
- Wikidata
View/Edit Human

Phospholipase A and acyltransferase 4 is an enzyme that in humans is encoded by the PLAAT4 gene (previously RARRES3). This enzyme has also been called retinoic acid receptor responder 3, since its expression can be induced by retinoic acid (active vitamin A).

Retinoids exert biologic effects such as potent growth inhibitory and cell differentiation activities and are used in the treatment of hyperproliferative dermatological diseases. These effects are mediated by specific nuclear receptor proteins that are members of the steroid and thyroid hormone receptor superfamily of transcriptional regulators. RARRES1, RARRES2, and RARRES3 are genes whose expression is upregulated by the synthetic retinoid tazarotene. RARRES3 is thought act as a tumor suppressor or growth regulator.

== Interactions ==
RARRES3 has been shown to interact with RNF135.
