= Efferocytosis =

Process of apoptotic cell removal in cell biology

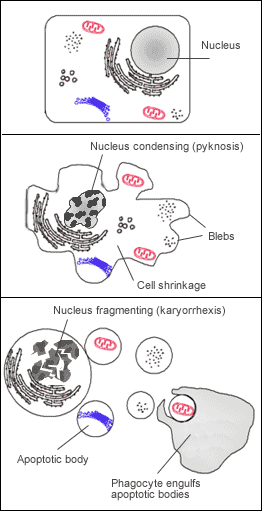
Labelled diagram of a cell undergoing apoptosis

In cell biology, efferocytosis (from efferre, Latin for 'to carry out' (to the grave), extended meaning 'to bury') is the process by which apoptotic cells are removed by phagocytic cells. It can be regarded as the 'burying of dead cells'.

During efferocytosis, the cell membrane of phagocytic cells engulfs the apoptotic cell, forming a large fluid-filled vesicle containing the dead cell. This ingested vesicle is called an efferosome (in analogy to the term phagosome). This process is similar to macropinocytosis.

== Mechanism ==
For apoptosis, the effect of efferocytosis is that dead cells are removed before their membrane integrity is breached and their contents leak into the surrounding tissue. This prevents exposure of tissue to toxic enzymes, oxidants and other intracellular components such as proteases and caspases.

Efferocytosis can be performed not only by 'professional' phagocytic cells such as macrophages or dendritic cells, but also by many other cell types including epithelial cells and fibroblasts. To distinguish them from living cells, apoptotic cells carry specific 'eat me' signals, such as the presence of phosphatidyl serine (resulting from phospholipid flip-flop) or calreticulin on the outer leaflet of the cell membrane.

== Downstream consequences ==
Efferocytosis triggers specific downstream intracellular signal transduction pathways, for example resulting in anti-inflammatory, anti-protease and growth-promoting effects. Conversely, impaired efferocytosis has been linked to autoimmune disease and tissue damage. Efferocytosis results in production by the ingesting cell of mediators such as hepatocyte- and vascular endothelial growth factor, which are thought to promote replacement of the dead cells.

Specialized pro-resolving mediators are cell-derived metabolites of certain polyunsaturated fatty acids viz.: arachidonic acid which is metabolized to the lipoxins; eicosapentaenoic acid which is metabolized to the resolvin E's; docosahexaenoic acid which is metabolized to the resolvin D's, maresins, and neuroprotectins; and n-3 docosapentaenoic acid which is metabolized to the n-3 docosapentaenoic acid-derived resolvins and n-3 docosapentaenoic acid-derived neuroprotectins. These mediators possess a broad range of overlapping activities which act to resolve inflammation; one of the important activities which many of these mediators possess is the stimulation of efferocytosis in inflamed tissues. Failure to form sufficient amounts of these mediators is proposed to be one cause of chronic and pathological inflammatory responses.

== Clinical significance ==
Defective efferocytosis has been demonstrated in such diseases as cystic fibrosis and bronchiectasis, chronic obstructive pulmonary disease, asthma and idiopathic pulmonary fibrosis, rheumatoid arthritis, systemic lupus erythematosus, glomerulonephritis and atherosclerosis. This is due to plaque buildup as a result of defective efferocytosis. Plaque build up leads to development of large necrotic cores and thin caps. The resulting inflammation and necrosis releases the cell's contents and causes more inflammation. Cytokines can aid in preventing defective efferocytosis due to their ability to push macrophages towards M1 or M2 character, which as pro-inflammatory and pro-resolving, respectively.
