= C12H10O4 =

The molecular formula C_{12}H_{10}O_{4} (molar mass: 218.21 g/mol, exact mass: 218.0579 u) may refer to:

- Acifran
- Inotilone
- Piperic acid
