= Evolution of schizophrenia =

Theory of natural selection

The evolution of schizophrenia refers to the theory of natural selection working in favor of selecting traits that are characteristic of the disorder. Positive symptoms are features that are not present in healthy individuals but appear as a result of the disease process. These include visual and/or auditory hallucinations, delusions, paranoia, and major thought disorders. Negative symptoms refer to features that are normally present but are reduced or absent as a result of the disease process, including social withdrawal, apathy, anhedonia, alogia, and behavioral perseveration. Cognitive symptoms of schizophrenia involve disturbances in executive functions, working memory impairment, and inability to sustain attention.

Given the high numbers of individuals diagnosed with schizophrenia (nearly 1% of modern-day populations), it is unlikely that the disorder has arisen solely from random mutations. Instead it is believed that, despite its maladaptive nature, schizophrenia has been either selected for throughout the years or exists as a selective by-product.

== Hypotheses ==
=== Balancing Selection and Positive Selection Hypothesis ===
The balancing selection hypothesis suggests that balancing selection, an evolutionary mechanism, has allowed for the persistence of certain schizophrenia genes. This mechanism is defined as maintaining multiple alleles of a gene in the gene pool of a population despite having selective pressures. Heterozygote advantage, a mechanism of balancing selection, is when the presence of both the dominant and recessive allele for a particular gene allows for greater fitness in an individual as compared to if the individual only expressed one type of allele. This mechanism can be seen in the carriers for the schizophrenia gene who express both the dominant and recessive allele. These carriers may express certain advantageous traits that would allow the schizophrenia gene to be selected for. Evidence has suggested a carrier of the schizophrenia gene could experience selective advantage due to their expression of advantageous traits as compared to those who do not express the schizophrenia gene. Studies have shown that some of the carriers for the schizophrenia gene may express adaptive benefits such as a decreased frequency of viral infections. Additional beneficial traits may include a higher IQ, increased creativity, and mathematical reasoning. Some evolutionary models show that schizophrenia persists through balancing selection, while divergent thinking adds creativity. These hypotheses are heavily debated and are not considered definitive explanations, even with studies with other animals. Due to the presence of these beneficial traits, the schizophrenia gene has not been selected against and has remained prevalent in human development over numerous generations. While the idea of balancing selection hypothesis sounds plausible, there is no substantial evidence in support of this hypothesis. Within the studies that found a positive correlation between specific favorable characteristics and the schizophrenia gene, only a few carriers were tested, meaning that there is no sufficient evidence to assume a direct correlation between these advantageous traits and the carriers of schizophrenia. Although this hypothesis has not yet been substantiated, the advantageous traits that these carriers express could provide a reasonable explanation for why the genes for schizophrenia have not been eliminated.

Positive selection is another mechanism that has allowed for the selection of genes contributing to the presence of schizophrenia. Positive selection is a mechanism of natural selection in which beneficial traits are selected for and become prevalent over time in a population. In a study conducted using phylogeny-based maximum-likelihood (PAML), a method that was used to test for positive selection, significant evidence of positive selection was found in the genes associated with schizophrenia. An example of a beneficial trait that has been selected for through positive selection is creativity. Three allelic variants of creativity genes that are also associated with schizophrenia include SLC6A4, TPH1 and DRD2. The high inheritance of creative and cognitive characteristics by these allelic variants in individuals expressing schizophrenia confirms evidence of positive selection within some schizophrenia genes. Additional studies conducted using SNP analysis on the SLC39A8 gene, a gene associated with schizophrenia, found that the T-allele on the gene was associated with reduced blood pressure and a decreased risk of hypertension. These beneficial traits associated with schizophrenia genes provide an explanation for selection of these genes in human development. While promising evidence persists, additional evidence claims that the effect of positive selection may not play a significant role in the presence of schizophrenia. Studies conducted through the use of FST and methods based on sample frequency spectrum (SFS) failed to find convincing signals of positive selection on the CGC-type of the ST8SIA2 gene, another gene associated with schizophrenia.

A 2013 systematic review and meta-analysis found that the siblings of schizophrenics had a slightly lower fertility rate than the general population while parents of schizophrenics had a fertility rate roughly similar, leading the researchers to conclude that a compensatory fitness advantage in siblings and parents cannot explain the maintenance of schizophrenia in the human population.

=== Social brain hypothesis ===
A social brain refers to the higher cognitive and affective systems of the brain, evolving as a result of social selection and serving as the basis for social interaction; it is the basis of the complexity of social interactions of which humans are capable. Mechanisms comprising the social brain include emotional processing, theory of mind, self-referencing, prospection and working memory. Patients display defects in various regions of the social brain, such as an inability to grasp social goals, which serves as an indication of a defect in theory of mind. This defect can be caused by the rapid selection for genes associated with language and cognitive ability within the human species. These rapid evolutionary changes, in some cases, may impede normal development within the social brain.

As schizophrenia is foremost a disorder of the consciousness, it has been suggested that schizophrenia exists as an unwanted byproduct of the evolution of the prefrontal cortex and other brain regions constituting the social brain. Under increasingly selective pressure induced by increasingly complex social living, the regions of the brain have grown as a means of accommodation and in turn have given rise to vulnerable neural systems. One hypothesis suggests this vulnerability in neural systems has made it possible for changes in genes associated with the social brain that affect neurogenesis, neuronal migration, arborisation, or apoptosis. Although it is unclear which of these factors have exhibited gene changes, it is likely that these changes have contributed to the defect in neurodevelopment seen in schizophrenia patients. A second hypothesis suggests that disturbance in the brain's frontal circuits, a region that largely constitutes the social brain, can lead to a lack of regulation in cognitive control and processing. This defect in regulation could increase the susceptibility for a social disorder like schizophrenia.

=== Social advantage hypothesis ===
This hypothesis refers to the worship of psychics and seers in the times of early civilization; the hallucinatory behavior and delusions brought by schizophrenia may have been highly regaled and allowed the individual to be conferred the title of saint or prophet, raising him or her on the social spectrum and allowing for social selection to act on the behalf of the disorder. This hypothesis lacks evidence and has not aided in explaining the continued persistence of schizophrenia in modern-day society where people showing symptoms of schizophrenia are typically not identified as saints or prophets.

=== Physiological advantage hypothesis ===
This hypothesis maintains that people with schizophrenia possess a physiological advantage in the form of disease or infection resistance, a theory that has found basis in diseases such as sickle-cell anemia. In one particular study, NAD, an energy carrier found in animals and yeast, is found to be capable of diminishing infectivity of tuberculosis when present in large quantities; this is done by repressing gene expression. However, M. tuberculosis bacterium has been shown to be capable of acting as a drain on NAD supply.

Studies in kynurenine pathway activation reveal that M. tuberculosis infection of the pathway causes niacin receptors in the pathway to indicate high levels of niacin, a precursor to NAD that makes de novo synthesis of NAD from tryptophan unnecessary. This change creates the illusion that NAD levels are adequate and that tryptophan conversion is unnecessary. Coevolution with M. tuberculosis has resulted in an attempt to overcome this illusion in a variety of manners, including the up-regulation of niacin receptors and up-regulation of de novo synthesis of NAD from tryptophan via the kynurenine pathway.

An enzyme implicated in the initiation of the kynurenine pathway, tryptophan 2,3-dioxygenase (TDO2) is found to activate during niacin-deficient conditions and is also found to be in increased levels in schizophrenic brains. In the postmortem brain tissue of people with schizophrenia, the protein for the high affinity niacin receptor was significantly decreased and, as a result, would allow for the up-regulation of mRNA transcript for the niacin receptor.

=== Shamanistic hypothesis ===
This hypothesis purports that schizophrenia is a vestigial behaviour that was once adaptive to hunting and gathering tribes. Psychosis prompts shamans to communicate with the spirit world, which results in the formation of religious myths. The shamanistic theory posits that the universal presence of shamanism in all hunting and gathering societies is likely due to heritable factors – the same heritable factors that support the worldwide distribution of schizophrenia. One modern version of the theory has invoked the evolutionary mechanism of group selection in order to explain the apparent genetic-based task specialization of shamanism.

=== Immune system Hypothesis ===
Perinatal exposure
It has been suggested that acute neuroinflammation during early fetal development may contribute to schizophrenia pathogenesis. The risk of schizophrenia is higher among those who experienced prenatal maternal viral infections like influenza, rubella, measles, and polio as well as bacterial or reproductive infections. The brain is highly sensitive to environmental insults during early development. Factors common to the immune response to a variety of pathogens are mediators in linking the commonalities between prenatal/perinatal infection and neurodevelopmental disorders. One hypothesis suggests that enhanced expression of proinflammatory cytokines and other mediators of inflammation in the maternal, fetal, and neonatal compartments may interfere with brain development, thereby increasing the risk for long-term brain dysfunction later in life.

Increased Pro-inflammatory Cytokines
Another hypothesis seeking to explain why schizophrenia occurs aim at understanding the activation of the immune system. The activation of the inflammatory response system mediated by cytokines may play a key role in the pathogenesis of schizophrenia. Evidence suggests that serum levels of IL-2, IL-6, IL-8, and TNF-α are significantly elevated in patients with chronic treatment-resistant schizophrenia. Nuclear factor-kappa B regulates the expression of cytokines and an increase in NF-κB levels leads to an increase in proinflammatory cytokine levels

Brain-derived Neurotrophic Factor
Individuals with schizophrenia have lower levels of brain-derived neurotrophic factor or BDNF. BDNF is responsible for promoting the proliferation, regeneration, and survival of neurons. It is also important for the regulation of cognitive function, something individuals with schizophrenia have trouble doing. Lower BDNF expression is associated with increased IL-6 expression, and increased cortisol levels. The more pro-inflammatory cytokines in circulation, the more the BDNF production decreases. This implies that an excess amount of pro-inflammatory cytokines negatively affects BDNF production. This, in turn, affects the presence and severity of psychosis in individuals with schizophrenia.

=== Self-domestication hypothesis ===
The theory of self-domestication asserts that during the late Pleistocene period, archaic humans split from their hominid ancestors and underwent behavioral changes that led to a reduction of aggression and an increase in "tameness". As a result of this transformation, changes to humans' biological, morphological, physiological, and genetic development occurred; leading to anatomical changes in size, craniofacial structure, and brain structural differences, as well as changes in behavior related reduced levels of stress hormones and delayed maturation of the adrenal glands. The self-domestication hypothesis for evolution of schizophrenia observes the importance our self-domesticated evolution, with emphasis on its contribution to the altered genetic development of the neural crest and our relaxed social cultural niche. Adaptations related these domesticated changes favored the emergence of complex cognitive abilities, including advanced linguistic cognition.

The self-domestication hypothesis suggests that schizophrenia results from hypofunction of the neural crest development, triggered by the selection for domesticated "tameness", and emphasize the domestic characteristics that make up the clinical phenotype of schizophrenia. Deficits related to language production and processing are prevalent in both positive and negative symptoms of schizophrenia. In addition, schizophrenic patients often demonstrate more marked domesticated traits at the morphological, physiological, and behavioral levels; including craniofacial abnormalities, desensitized cortical response to stress, and disorganized speech.

A study published in 2017 targeted various candidate genes (FOXD3, RET, SOX9, SOX10, GDNF) with overlapping function in relation to schizophrenia, domestication, and neural crest development, and found the largest number of brain area expressions include to be in the frontal cortex, associate striatum nucleus, and hippocampus. Although the results do not reflect the molecular events that occurred during early neural development or evolution, they provide insight into the molecular network that underlies the impaired cognitive and social scenarios that act in the schizophrenic brain, and further suggest that self-domestication, language processing, and schizophrenia have an intimately intertwined relationship.

=== Sexual selection hypothesis ===
This hypothesis builds upon Crespi and Badcock's imprinted brain hypothesis of autism and psychosis by suggesting that the behavioral traits associated with autism and schizophrenia have been beneficial for individual reproductive, mating, and parental strategies; and therefore, have been maintained throughout the human population via sexual selection. Under this hypothesis, autistic- and schizotypy-like traits exist as diametric opposites joined on the same spectrum of normal cognition, and most people display moderate degrees of one or both types of traits.

When the spectrum of traits intertwine with the dynamics of genomic imprinting and principles of sexual selection within the context of bipaternal investment patterns, traits act as ornaments of mating behavior. Whereas autistic-like traits are selected for based on their display of mechanistic and practical intelligence for obtaining resources that indicate support for a long-term relationship, schizotypy-traits demonstrate verbal and artistic creativity that indicate strong genetic fitness for a short-term mating strategy.

Therefore, variation in different cognitive traits remain adaptive life-history, reproductive, and paternal strategies according to the local ecological conditions and personal characteristics. Although the hypothesis proposes that the cognitive traits do not originate by means of sexual selection and likely evolved for reasons unrelated to mating, the behavioral effects dictated by the genetic autistic- and schizotypy-traits remain varied in the environment and remain under selection; only extreme variants of either of the traits result in their respective clinical condition.

== See also ==
- Evolutionary approaches to schizophrenia
- Evolutionary approaches to depression
