= Hydroxycarboxylic acid receptor 2 =

Protein-coding gene in the species Homo sapiens

HCAR2

Identifiers
- Aliases: HCAR2, GPR109A, HCA2, HM74a, HM74b, NIACR1, PUMAG, Puma-g, Niacin receptor 1, hydroxycarboxylic acid receptor 2
- External IDs: OMIM: 609163; MGI: 1933383; GeneCards: HCAR2

Gene location (Human)
Chr.	Chromosome 12 (human)
Band	12q24.31	Start	122,701,293 bp
Band	12q24.31	End	122,703,357 bp

Gene location (Mouse)
Chr.	Chromosome 5 (mouse)
Band	5|5 F	Start	124,001,633 bp
Band	5|5 F	End	124,003,562 bp
RNA expression pattern
Bgee	Human / Mouse (ortholog); Top expressed in: blood; olfactory zone of nasal mucosa; granulocyte; skin of abdomen; gonad; skin of leg; spleen; bone marrow; minor salivary glands; subcutaneous adipose tissue / Top expressed in: granulocyte; esophagus; lip; skin of external ear; morula; subcutaneous adipose tissue; skin of back; transitional epithelium of urinary bladder; trachea; skin of abdomen; More reference expression data
BioGPS	n/a
Gene ontology
Molecular function	nicotinic acid receptor activity; G protein-coupled receptor activity; signal transducer activity
Cellular component	integral component of membrane; cell junction; plasma membrane; membrane
Biological process	apoptotic process; negative regulation of lipid catabolic process; positive regulation of adiponectin secretion; signal transduction; positive regulation of neutrophil apoptotic process; neutrophil apoptotic process; G protein-coupled receptor signaling pathway
Sources:Amigo / QuickGO
Orthologs
Databases	NCBI: entry; OMA: entry
Species	Human	Mouse
Entrez	338442	80885
Ensembl	ENSG00000182782	ENSMUSG00000045502
UniProt	Q8TDS4	Q9EP66
RefSeq (mRNA)	NM_177551	NM_030701
RefSeq (protein)	NP_808219	NP_109626
Location (UCSC)	Chr 12: 122.7 – 122.7 Mb	Chr 5: 124 – 124 Mb
PubMed search
- Wikidata
View/Edit Human	View/Edit Mouse

Hydroxycarboxylic acid receptor 2 (HCA_{2}), also known as GPR109A and niacin receptor 1 (NIACR1), is a protein which in humans is encoded (its formation is directed) by the HCAR2 gene and in rodents by the Hcar2 gene. The human HCAR2 gene is located on the long (i.e., "q") arm of chromosome 12 at position 24.31 (notated as 12q24.31). Like the two other hydroxycarboxylic acid receptors, HCA_{1} and HCA_{3}, HCA_{2} is a G protein-coupled receptor (GPCR) located on the surface membrane of cells. HCA_{2} binds and thereby is activated by D-β-hydroxybutyric acid (hereafter termed β-hydroxybutyric acid), butyric acid, and niacin (also known as nicotinic acid). β-Hydroxybutyric and butyric acids are regarded as the endogenous agents that activate HCA_{2}. Under normal conditions, niacin's blood levels are too low to do so: it is given as a drug in high doses in order to reach levels that activate HCA_{2}.

β-Hydroxybutyric acid, butyric acid, and niacin have actions that are independent of HCA_{2}. For example: 1) β-hydroxybutyric acid activates free fatty acid receptor 3 and inhibits some histone deacetylases that regulate the expression of various genes, increase mitochondrial adenosine triphosphate production, and promote antioxidant defenses; 2) butyric acid activates free fatty acid receptor 2 and like β-hydroxybutyric acid activates free fatty acid receptor 3 and inhibits some histone deacetylases; and 3) niacin is an NAD^{+} precursor (see nicotinamide adenine dinucleotide) which when converted to NAD^{+} can alter over 500 enzymatic reactions that play key roles in regulating inflammation, mitochondrion functions, autophagy, and apoptosis. Consequently, studies examining the functions of HCA_{2} based on the actions of butyric acid, β-hydroxybutyric acid, niacin, or other HCA_{2} activators need to provide data indicating that they actually do so by activating HCA_{2}. One commonly used way to do this is to show that the activators have no or reduced effects on Hca2 gene knockout cells or animals (i.e., cells or animals that had their HCa2 genes removed or inactivated) or gene knockdown cells or animals (i.e., cells or animals that had their HCa2 genes ability to express HCA_{2} greatly reduced). The studies reported here on HCA_{2} activators focus on those that included experiments in Hca2 gene knockout and/or knockdown cells and animals.

Studies, done mostly in animals and the cells taken from animals or humans, show or suggest that HCA_{2} functions to 1) inhibit lipolysis and 2) inhibit inflammation and thereby suppress the development of certain diseases in which inflammation contributes to their development and/or severity. These diseases include: atherosclerosis, stroke, Alzheimer's disease, Parkinson's disease, multiple sclerosis, pathological pain (i.e. pain due to the abnormal activation of neurons), mastitis, hepatitis due to heavy alcohol consumption, inflammatory bowel diseases, cancer of the colon, and, possibly, psoriasis and brain damage due to heavy alcohol consumption.

== HCA_{2} and HCA_{3} homodimer and heterodimer proteins ==
HCA_{2} is commonly formed and regarded as a homodimer, i.e. to be composed of two adjoined HCA_{2} proteins. However, a heterodimer composed of the HCA_{2} protein adjoined to the HCA_{3} protein has been detected in human embryonic kidney HEK 293 cells. The human HCAR2 and HCAR3 genes sit next to each other on chromosome 12 at position 24.31 and have an amino acid sequence homology greater than 95%. While there appears to be no significant difference in the responses triggered by activation of cells expressing the HCA_{2} homodimer versus the HCA_{2}/HCA_{3} heterodimer proteins, more studies are needed to confirm this. Furthermore: 1) HCA_{2} and HCA_{1} are found in most mammalian species but HCA_{3} is found only in higher primates and 2) monodimeric HCA_{2} and HCA_{3} proteins may show very different ligand sensitivities, e.g., niacin binds to and activates HCA_{2} but does not or only weakly binds to and activates HCA_{3}. Studies on HCA_{2} in human cells and tissues have not determined the extent to which these cells and tissues also express HCA_{3} and form HCA_{3}-HCA_{3} heterodimers. The studies cited here may need to be revised if future studies find that HCA_{2}-HCA_{3} heterodimers are involved in the effects of "HCA_{2} activators".

== Cells and tissues expressing HCA_{2} ==
HCA_{2} is expressed by: 1) certain cells in the immune system, e.g., neutrophils, monocytes, macrophages, dermal dendritic cells, and lymphocytes; 2) cells in the small intestine and colon epithelum that face the intestinal lumen; 3) the skin's epithelial cells, keratinocytes, and Langerhans cells; 4) brown and white adipose tissue fat cells; 5) cells in the mammary gland's epithelium; 6) hepatocytes; 7) multinucleated osteoclasts in bone tissues; 8) kidney podocytes; and 9) cells in the nervous system, e.g., microglia cells in the brain's cerebral cortex and hippocampus, cells in the eye's retinal pigment epithelium, the astrocytes and neurons in the brain's rostral ventrolateral medulla, and the peripheral nervous system's Schwann and satellite glial cells.

== HCA_{2} activating agents ==
In addition to butyric acid, β-hydroxybutyric acid, and niacin, the following agents have been reported to activate HCA_{2}: monomethyl fumarate, dimethyl fumarate (dimethyl fumarate is a prodrug, i.e. it does not directly activate HCA_{2} but is rapidly converted in animal intestines to monomethyl fumarate), Acifran (Acifran also binds to HCA_{3} but with less affinity for it than for HCA_{3}), Acipimox, SCH 900271, MK-6892, MK-1903, GSK256073, and N2L.

== HCA_{2}'s function in lipolysis ==
Lipolysis is the metabolic pathway in which triglycerides are hydrolyzed, i.e., enzymatically broken down, into their component free fatty acids and glycerol. The activation of this pathway leads fat cells to release the newly freed fatty acids into the circulation and thereby raises serum free fatty acid levels; the inhibition of this lipolysis leads to falls in serum free fatty acid levels. The intravascular injection of niacin into control mice rapidly reduced their serum fatty acid levels but did not do so in Hcar2 gene knockout mice. Thus, HCA_{2} functions to inhibit lipolysis and lower serum fatty acid levels in mice. Niacin likewise inhibits lipolysis to lower free fatty acid plasma levels in humans. Furthermore, the HCA_{2}-activating drug, MK-1903, when taken orally by healthy volunteers in phase 1 and 2 clinical trials, dramatically lowered their plasma free fatty acids levels. Like niacin, flushing was the drug's only major adverse effect. Unlike niacin, however, MK-1903 had far less effects than niacin on the plasma levels of triglycerides and HDL-c] (i.e., cholesterol-associated High density lipoprotein) which are niacin's therapeutic targets for treating primary hyperlipidemia and hypertriglyceridemia. These findings suggest but need further studies to determine if niacin and Mk-1903 inhibit lipolysis in humans by activating HCA_{2}. Studies suggest that HCA_{1} and, possibly, HCA_{3} also inhibit lipolysis.

== HCA_{2}'s functions in various diseases ==
=== Atherosclerosis ===
Atherosclerosis is a chronic inflammatory arterial disease that can cause the narrowing or occlusion of arteries and thereby various cardiovascular diseases such as heart attacks and strokes. In a murine ApoE−/− model of atherosclerosis, mice were fed a cholesterol‐rich (i.e., atherosclerosis-promoting) diet concurrently with β-hydroxybutyric acid, nicotine, or salt water daily for 9 weeks. The aortas of β-hydroxybutyric acid-treated and niacin-treated mice had far less histological evidence of atherosclerosis (i.e., less atherosclerotic plaques, lipid depositions, and infiltrating M1 inflammation-promoting macrophages) than salt water-treated mice. β-Hydroxybutyric acid-fed mice also had significantly lower blood plasma levels of three pro-inflammatory cytokines, tumor necrosis factor-α, interleukin-6, and interleukin-1β, than salt water-treated mice. Further studies found that 1) β-hydroxybutyric acid inhibited lipopolysaccharide-simulated maturation of normal bone marrow‐derived macrophages to M1 macrophages but did not do so in macrophages taken from the bone marrows of Hcar2 gene knockout mice and 2) mice constructed to have Hcar2 gene knockout but no normal bone marrow cells who were treated with β-hydroxybutyric acid had significantly more evidence of arterial inflammation and atherosclerosis than β-hydroxybutyric acid-treated mice who had normal bone marrow cells. These results indicate that the anti-inflammatory and anti-atherosclerotic effects of β-hydroxybutyric acid in ApoE−/− mice depend on bone‐marrow‐derived HCA_{2}-expressing cells, possibly M1 macrophages. Further studies are needed to determine if HCA_{2} acts to suppress the development and/or progression of human atherosclerosis.

=== Stroke ===
Stroke is the development of persistent brain disfunction caused by the interruption of blow flow and subsequent damage to the brain. The inflammation that develops in damaged areas of the brain causes further brain damage. Studies have reported that HCA_{2} reduces the inflammation and thereby the extent of brain damage in animal models of stroke. Mice that had a distal portion of their middle cerebral arteries occluded were treated with either β-hydroxybutyric acid or niacin shortly before and up to 48 hours after occluding the artery. β-Hydroxybutyric acid-treated mice had less damaged brain tissue and better performances in corner testing (i.e., control mice but not β-hydroxybutyric acid-treated mice tended to turn toward the side opposite the damaged brain site). β-Hydroxybutyric acid did not reduce the brain damage or improve corner test performance in Hca2 gene knockout mice. Niacin likewise reduced the size of the damaged brain site in normal but not in Hca2 gene knockout mice. And, mice feed a ketogenic diet for 14 days (which increased their plasma levels of β-hydroxybutyric acid) also had reductions in the size of their brains' damaged sites. The diet had no such effect inHca2 gene knockout mice. Further studies indicated that the effect of niacin in reducing the size of damage brain sites involved the stimulation of HCA_{2}-bearing monocytes and/or macrophages to produce prostaglandin D2. (Prostaglandin D2 has anti-inflammatory actions.) Finally, several other studies, while not examining Hcar2 gene knockout or knockdown animals, reported that β-hydroxybutyric acid, niacin. monomethyl fumarate, and dimethyl fumarate reduced the inflammation, tissue damage, and/or symptoms in middle cerebral artery occlusion animal models of stroke. These results indicate that HCA_{2} reduces the clinical consequences of stroke in rodents and support further studies that may lead to the development of novel treatments for stroke in humans.

=== Alzheimer's disease ===
Alzheimer's disease is a form of dementia that is associated with the activation of the brain's pro-inflammatory microglial cells; the increased production of pro-inflammatory cytokines; and the accumulation in the brain of a) extracellular amyloid plaques consisting of misfolded amyloid-β protein, b) amyloid-beta precursor protein (which is enzymatically broken down to amyloid-β protein), and c) intracellular aggregates of hyperphosphorylated tau protein. Individuals with Alzheimer's disease commonly show progressively worsening declines in cognitive, behavioral, and sensorimotor functions along with increasing accumulations of aggregated amyloid-β proteins (which may be a key factor in the development of Alzheimer's disease). In the 5XFAD murine model of Alzheimer's disease, mice were treated with β-hydroxybutyric acid or a placebo. Compared to placebo-treated mice, β-hydroxybutyric acid-mice showed better performances in cognitive/memory testing; lower brain levels of the pro-inflammatory cytokines interleukin-1 beta, tumor necrosis factor-alpha, and interleukin-6; lower levels of brain amyloid-beta precursor protein and amyloid-β protein; and higher levels of neprilysin, an enzyme that degrades amyloid proteins and is essential to prevent Alzheimer's disease in mice (i.e., mice lacking a functional gene that encodes neprilysin develop Alzheimer's disease-like symptoms). In another study, 5xFAD mice who received β-hydroxybutyric acid subcutaneously for 28 days showed better cognitive functions, lower levels of Aβ peptide accumulation in the brain, and greater activation of microglia cells in the brain compared to placebo-treated mice. Furthermore, HCA_{2} messenger RNA levels were increased in the brains of these mice during the period of active plaque deposition. (The postmortem brain tissues of patients with Alzheimer's disease also contained higher HCA_{2} messenger RNA levels that those of individuals who did not have Alzheimer's disease.) In a third study, 5XFAD control mice that had normal levels of HCA_{2} or had their Hca2 gene knocked out were treated with a FDA-approved formulation of niacin, Niaspan. Niaspan-treated control mice had less brain neuron losses, fewer and smaller brain plaques, and better memory (as measured on a y-maze task test) than mice not treated with Niaspan: Niaspan did not produce these changes in Hca2 gene knockout mice. These results indicate that HCA_{2} suppresses the progression of Alzheimer's disease in a mouse model and support further studies with the ultimate goal of determining if HCA_{2} activators would be a useful addition to the treatment of Alzheimer's disease.

=== Parkinson's disease ===
Individuals with Parkinson's disease develop progressively less control of their motor movements in association with progressively greater losses of dopamine neurons within the pars compacta subdivision of their brain's substantia nigra. After longer times with the disease, individuals may also develop worsening cognition symptoms and, ultimately, Parkinson's disease dementia. Some studies suggest that HCA_{2} may act to suppress this disease's progression. In a mouse model of Parkinson's disease, control male mice and Hcar2 gene knockout male mice received lipopolysaccharide (an inflammation-inducing bacterial toxin) injections into the right substantia nigra of their brains and examined 28 days after the injections. Compared to control mice, Hcar2 gene knockout mice evidenced greater injury to their dopamine neurons, severer motor deficits, and more inflammation as judged by the levels of three pro-inflammatory cytokines (i.e., interleukin-6, interleukin-1β, and tumor necrosis factor-α) in their midbrain tissues and serum. Further studies examined mice that had their Hcar2 gene knocked out in their microglia but not in other tissues. Following the lipopolysaccharide injection protocol just described, the mice were feed a niacin solution for 28 days. This regimen alleviated dopamine neuron injuries and motor deficits in control mice but not in mice constructed to have Hcar2 gene knockout microglial cells. In the model of MPTP-induced Parkinson's disease, mice received intraperitoneal injections of MPTP or a placebo (e.g., salt water) daily for 7 days followed by daily feeding (by gavage) of a salt water placebo, butyric acid, or monomethyl fumarate for 14 days. Compared to mice not treated with MPTP, mice treated with MPTP followed by salt water developed defective motor functions as defined in three different tests, lower dopamine levels in their corpus striatum, activation of the microglia in their substantia nigra, and evidence of systemic inflammation (i.e., increased serum levels of the pro-inflammatory cytokines, tumor necrosis factor-α and interleuken-6). Mice treated with MPTP followed by butyric acid or monomethyl fumarate were significantly protected from developing these changes. Further studies suggested that the activation of HCA_{2} on microglial cells stimulated their change from a pro-inflammatory to anti-inflammatory phenotype. These results indicate that HCA_{2} suppresses the inflammation, neuronal damage, and neurological symptoms in mouse Parkinson's disease models and suggest that agents activating this receptor may be of use in treating and therefore should be further studied in humans with this disease.

=== Multiple sclerosis ===
Multiple sclerosis is an autoimmune demyelinating disease in which an individual's immune system's causes an inflammation-based destruction of the myelin sheath surrounding neurons in the central nervous system. This disrupts the afflicted neurons' functions and causes various neurological symptoms depending on which neurons are damaged. In a murine experimental autoimmune encephalomyelitis model of multiple sclerosis, mice taking oral dimethyl fumarate had less immune cell infiltration and demyelination in their spinal cords and improved motor function compared to mice not treated with dimethyl fumarate. These dimethyl fumarate-induced improvements did not occur in Hcar2 gene knockout mice. Studies in lipopolysaccaride-treated cultured murine microglial cells found that monomethyl fumarate switched the cells from a pro-inflammatory to an anti-inflammatory phenotype. Microglial cells pretreated with an antibody that binds to and thereby blocks activation of HCA_{2} did not show these phenotypic changes. These studies indicate that HCA_{2} acts to suppress the inflammation and thereby neurological symptoms in a mouse model of multiple sclerosis. In 2013, the Federal Drug Administration approved dimethyl fumarate (trade name Tecfidera) for the treatment of multiple sclerosis. Although it is now regarded as one of the front-line (i.e. first used) therapies for treating this disease, dimethyl fumarate's mechanism of action, including its impact on HCA_{2} in human multiple sclerosis, has not yet been defined and needs further study.

=== Pathological pain ===
Pathologic pain is due to the abnormal activation of neurons in pain signaling pathways) For example, neurons in the vertebral column's posterior horn of the spinal cord are part of one pain signaling pathway. Excessive activation of these neurons caused by inflammation stimulates the production of pro-inflammatory cytokines (e.g., interleukin-2 and tumor necrosis factor-α) and persistent nociplastic pain. Numerous studies in mice and rats have reported that β-hydroxybutyric acid, dimethyl fumarate, and MK-1903 have analgesic effects in models of thermal and mechanical hypersensitivity due to tibial bone fracture, intervertebral disc degeneration, complete Freund's adjuvant-induced arthritis, systemic lupus erythematosus, and chronic constriction of the sciatic nerve. In the mouse model of pain induced by chronic constriction of the sciatic nerve, the pain-relieving effects of β-hydroxybutyric acid and dimethyl fumarate did not occur in Hca2 gene knockout mice. These results indicate that HCA_{2} suppresses various types of pathological pain in mice and support studies to learn if it does so in humans.

=== Mastitis ===
Mastitis is an infection-related or sterile inflammation of breast tissue. In a murine model of mastitis, post-pregnant female mice drank niacin-containing or normal water for 26 days and then received lipopolysaccharide injections into the fourth pair of their mammary glands. The next day each mammary gland was examined. Mouse fed pure water had extensive inflammation of their lipopolysaccharide-injected mammary glands, elevated mammary gland levels of pro-inflammatory cytokines (i.e., interleukin-6, interleukin-1β, and tumor necrosis factor-α), severe structural abnormalities such as thickened walls around their breasts' milk-producing alveoli, and breakdown of the blood-milk barrier which prevents uncontrolled exchange of components between the blood and alveolar milk. The mammary glands of lipopolysaccharide-injected, niacin-fed control mice but not niacin-fed Hca2 gene knockout mice had far less of these changes. These results indicate that HCA_{2} functions to suppress the inflammation and tissue injuries that develop in a mouse model of mastitis. HCA_{2} may play a similar role in bovines: dairy cows with mastitis that were fed niacin for 7 days showed decreases in their serum and milk levels of pro-inflammatory cytokines (i.e., tumor necrosis factor-α, interleukin-6, and interleukin-1β) and fewer cells in their milk compared to cows with mastitis that were not treated with niacin. It was also noted that the mammary tissue levels of HCA_{2} were higher in cows with than those without mastitis. Thus, HCA_{2} may prove to be a target for treating mastitis in cows and might be useful to examine its roles in the in human mastitis.

=== Alcoholic hepatitis ===
In a model of alcohol-induced hepatitis, β-hydroxybutyric acid-treated mice showed less evidence of liver inflammation compared to control mice as indicated by their: 1) lower plasma levels of alanine transaminase (an enzyme released into the bloodstream by damaged liver cells); 2) less liver steatosis (i.e., lower levels of liver fat); and 3) lower numbers of inflammation-promoting neutrophils, higher numbers of inflammation-suppressing M2 macrophages, and higher levels of messenger RNA encoding an inflammation-suppressing cytokine, IL-10, in their livers. The inflammation-reducing effects of β-hydroxybutyric acid did not occur in Hcar2 gene knockout mice. In human studies, the concentration of β-hydroxybutyric acid in the livers of ten patients with alcoholic hepatitis was significantly lower than that of normal individuals. These findings indicate that HCA_{2} acts to reduce the severity of alcohol-induced hepatitis in mice and suggest that it may also do so, and therefore should be further studied, in humans.

=== Inflammatory bowel disease and colon cancer ===
Inflammatory bowel diseases, i.e., ulcerative colitis and Crohn's disease, are chronic inflammatory diseases of the gastrointestinal tract that can progress to colon cancer. Colon cancer, even if not preceded by an inflammatory bowel disease, commonly shows the presence of the inflammation response that is mounted to fight invading intestinal microorganisms. In a murine model of colitis, rats were given niacin or water for 2 weeks, given daily rectal injections of the colitis-inducing agent, iodoacetamide, and sacrificed on day 15. Compared to water-treated rats, niacin-treated rats developed milder colitis as defined by less declines in body weight, less declines in colon weights, and less rises in colon tissue levels of myeloperoxidase, an indicator of inflammatory cell (i.e. polymorphonuclear leukocytes) infiltration. In a murine model of colitis leading to colon cancer, mice were treated with dextran sulfate sodium to produce colitis and an intraperitoneal injection of azoxymethane, a colon cancer-causing carcinogen. In this Apc^{Min/+} murine model: 1) mice fed a diet that greatly reduced the levels of butyric acid in the colon developed colitis and numerous potentially pre-cancerous colon polyps; 2) mice fed a normal diet had less of these changes; and 3) niacin treatment of mice fed the butyric acid-reducing diet suppressed these changes but did not do so in Hcar2 gene knockout mice on the butyric acid-reducing diet. Thus, HCA_{2} acts to inhibit colitis in rat as well as mouse models of colitis and in the mouse ulcerative colitis model reduced the formation of potentially pre-cancerous polyps. In human studies, the levels of messenger RNA encoding HCA_{2} in 18 individuals with colon cancer were far lower in their cancers than their normal colon tissues and were also lower in 10 human colon cancer cell lines than 2 human non-cancerous colon cell lines. (HCA_{3} messenger RNA levels were also lower in the colon cancer than non-cancerous colon tissue of the patients.) Furthermore, individuals who have inflammatory bowel disease and consume a diet that increases their levels of β-hydroxybutyric and butyric acid have been suggested to show clinical improvements in their disease and a reduced rate of it progressing to colon cancer. These findings suggest that human colon cancers not preceded by an inflammatory bowel disease are associated with reductions in the expression of HCA_{2} (and HCA_{3}) due to gene silencing, that the reductions of HCA_{2} (and/or HCA_{3}) may be involved in the development and/or progression of these cancers. and that HCA_{2} may act to suppress human ulcerative colitis as well as its progression to colon cancer.

=== Other diseases ===
Activators of HCA_{2} have been shown to suppress the inflammation and severity of disease in two other animal models. However, these studies did not examine Hca2 gene knockout/knockdown animals. These models are for psoriasis and brain tissue inflammation, injury, and behavioral abnormalities caused by alcohol.

== Ligands ==
Agonists

- GSK256073
- MK6892
