= C10H11N3O2 =

The molecular formula C_{10}H_{11}N_{3}O_{2}(molar mass: 205.217 g/mol) may refer to:

- EZS-8
- IBC 293
- 5-Nitrotryptamine
