= Niacin receptor =

The known human niacin receptors (or nicotinic acid receptors, abbreviated NIACR) are:

- Niacin receptor 1 (NIACR1, formerly known as GPR109A)
- Niacin receptor 2 (NIACR2, formerly known as GPR109B)
