= Hydroxycarboxylic acid receptor 1 =

Protein-coding gene in the species Homo sapiens

HCAR1

Identifiers
- Aliases: HCAR1, GPR104, GPR81, HCA1, LACR1, TA-GPCR, TAGPCR, FKSG80, hydroxycarboxylic acid receptor 1
- External IDs: OMIM: 606923; MGI: 2441671; GeneCards: HCAR1

Gene location (Human)
Chr.	Chromosome 12 (human)
Band	12q24.31	Start	122,726,076 bp
Band	12q24.31	End	122,730,844 bp

Gene location (Mouse)
Chr.	Chromosome 5 (mouse)
Band	5|5 F	Start	124,014,799 bp
Band	5|5 F	End	124,018,083 bp
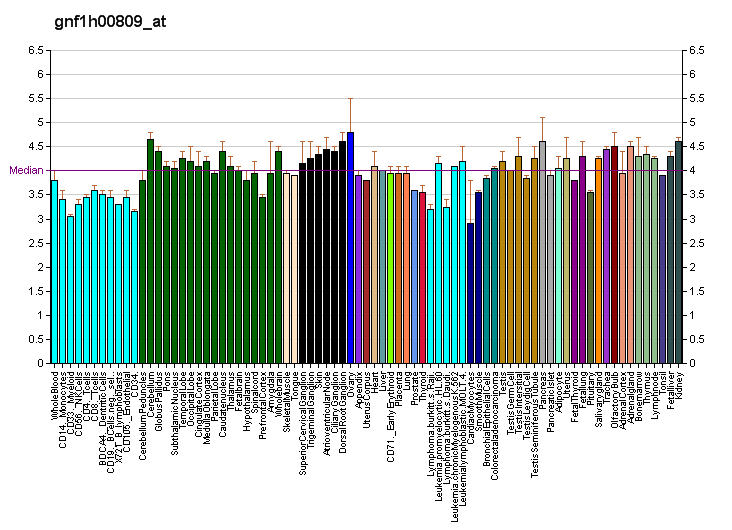
RNA expression pattern
Bgee	Human / Mouse (ortholog); Top expressed in: gonad; spleen; minor salivary glands; body of stomach; subcutaneous adipose tissue; stromal cell of endometrium; right lobe of thyroid gland; left lobe of thyroid gland; ganglionic eminence; human kidney / Top expressed in: brown adipose tissue; white adipose tissue; mammary gland; embryo; transitional epithelium of urinary bladder; subcutaneous adipose tissue; esophagus; dentate gyrus of hippocampal formation granule cell; right kidney; lacrimal gland; More reference expression data
BioGPS	More reference expression data
Gene ontology
Molecular function	G protein-coupled receptor activity; signal transducer activity
Cellular component	integral component of membrane; plasma membrane; membrane
Biological process	signal transduction; G protein-coupled receptor signaling pathway
Sources:Amigo / QuickGO
Orthologs
Databases	NCBI: entry; OMA: entry
Species	Human	Mouse
Entrez	27198	243270
Ensembl	ENSG00000196917	ENSMUSG00000049241
UniProt	Q9BXC0	Q8C131
RefSeq (mRNA)	NM_032554	NM_175520
RefSeq (protein)	NP_115943	NP_780729
Location (UCSC)	Chr 12: 122.73 – 122.73 Mb	Chr 5: 124.01 – 124.02 Mb
PubMed search
- Wikidata
View/Edit Human	View/Edit Mouse

Hydroxycarboxylic acid receptor 1 (HCA_{1}), formerly known as G protein-coupled receptor 81 (GPR81), is a protein that in humans is encoded by the HCAR1 gene. HCA_{1}, like the other hydroxycarboxylic acid receptors HCA_{2} and HCA_{3}, is a G_{i/o}-coupled G protein-coupled receptor (GPCR). The primary endogenous agonist of HCA_{1} is lactic acid (and its conjugate base, lactate). More recently, 3,5-dihydroxybenzoic acid has been reported to activate HCA_{1}.

Lactate was initially found to activate HCA_{1} on fat cells and thereby to inhibit these cells lipolysis i.e., break-down of their fats into free fatty acids and glycerol. Subsequent studies have found that in addition to fat cells, HCA_{1} is expressed on cells in the brain, skeletal muscle, lymphoid tissue, uterus, kidney, liver, and pancreas as well as on immune cells such as macrophages and antigen-presenting cells. In the brain, HCA_{1} acts to dampen neuron excitation and may also function to promote neurogenesis (the production of neurons from neural stem cells) and angiogenesis (the formation of new blood vessels from pre-existing blood vessels). The functions of HCA_{1} in non-fat and non-neural tissues have not been fully defined but in many cases appear to involve promoting the survival of cells, including various types of cancer cells.

== Ligands ==
Agonists

- AZ'5538
