= Acipimox =

Chemical compound

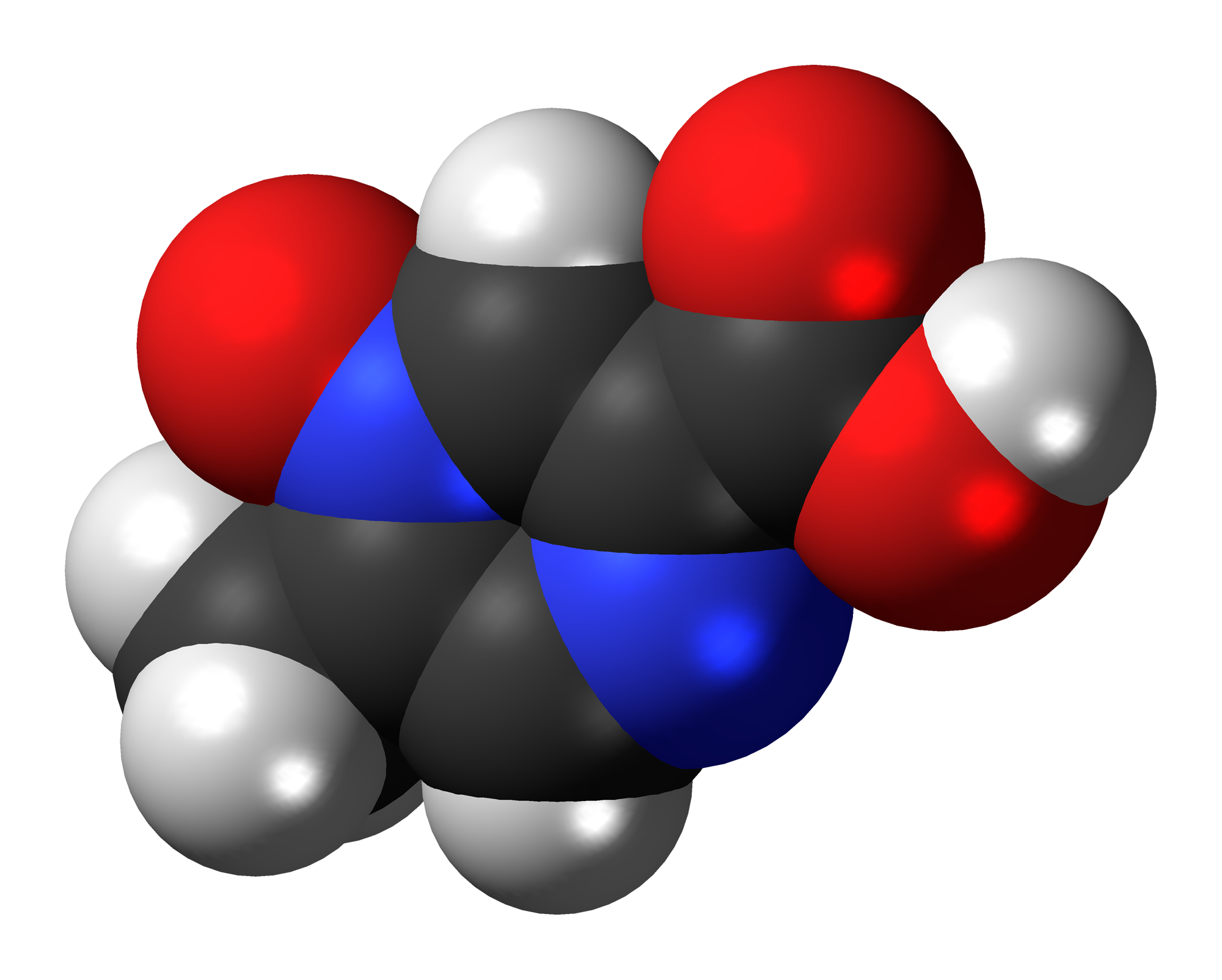

Clinical data
- Trade names: Olbetam
- AHFS/Drugs.com: UK Drug Information
- Routes of administration: Oral
- ATC code: C10AD06 (WHO)

Legal status
- Legal status: UK: POM (Prescription only)

Pharmacokinetic data
- Bioavailability: 100%
- Protein binding: None
- Metabolism: None
- Elimination half-life: Phase 1: 2 hrs Phase 2: 12–14 hrs
- Excretion: Renal

Identifiers
- IUPAC name: 5-Carboxy-2-methyl-1-oxidopyrazin-1-ium
- CAS Number: 51037-30-0
- PubChem CID: 5310993
- IUPHAR/BPS: 1596
- ChemSpider: 4470534
- UNII: K9AY9IR2SD
- KEGG: D07190
- ChEMBL: ChEMBL345714
- CompTox Dashboard (EPA): DTXSID2046202
- ECHA InfoCard: 100.051.736

Chemical and physical data
- Formula: C_{6}H_{6}N_{2}O_{3}
- Molar mass: 154.125 g·mol^{−1}
- 3D model (JSmol): Interactive image
- SMILES: [O-][n+]1c(cnc(C(=O)O)c1)C
- InChI: InChI=1S/C6H6N2O3/c1-4-2-7-5(6(9)10)3-8(4)11/h2-3H,1H3,(H,9,10); Key:DJQOOSBJCLSSEY-UHFFFAOYSA-N

Acipimox (trade name Olbetam in Europe) is a niacin derivative used as a lipid-lowering agent. It reduces triglyceride levels and increases HDL cholesterol. It may have less marked adverse effects than niacin, although it is unclear whether the recommended dose is as effective as standard doses of niacin.

== Contraindications ==
Contraindications are peptic ulcers, acute bleeding, recent heart attack, acute decompensated heart failure, and severe chronic kidney disease.

== Adverse effects ==
As with niacin and related drugs, the most common adverse effects are flushing (associated with prostaglandin D_{2}) and gastrointestinal disturbances such as indigestion, which occur in at least 10% of patients. Flushing can be reduced by taking aspirin 20 to 30 minutes before taking acipimox. Palpitations have also been described. High doses can cause headache, and precipitate gout. In contrast to niacin, no impairment of glucose tolerance and no disorders of liver function have been found in studies, even under high doses of acipimox.

== Interactions ==
No interactions with other drugs are known. Theoretically, combination with statins and fibrates could increase the incidence of myalgia. Alcohol can increase the risk of flushing.

== Pharmacology ==
=== Mechanism of action ===
Like niacin, acipimox acts on the niacin receptor 1, inhibiting the enzyme triglyceride lipase. This reduces the concentration of fatty acids in the blood plasma and their inflow into the liver. Consequently, VLDL cholesterol production in the liver is reduced, which leads indirectly to a reduction in LDL and increase in HDL cholesterol.

=== Pharmacokinetics ===
Acipimox is completely absorbed from the gut. It is not bound to blood plasma proteins and not metabolized. Elimination occurs in two phases, the first having a half-life of two hours, the second of 12 to 14 hours. The substance is eliminated via the kidney.
