= Hydroxycarboxylic acid receptor =

The hydroxycarboxylic acid receptor (abbreviated HCA receptor and HCAR) family includes the following human proteins:

- Hydroxycarboxylic acid receptor 1 (HCA_{1}, formerly known as GPR81)
- Hydroxycarboxylic acid receptor 2 (HCA_{2}, formerly known as niacin receptor 1 and GPR109A)
- Hydroxycarboxylic acid receptor 3 (HCA_{3}, formerly known as niacin receptor 2 and GPR109B)
