= AZ'5538 =

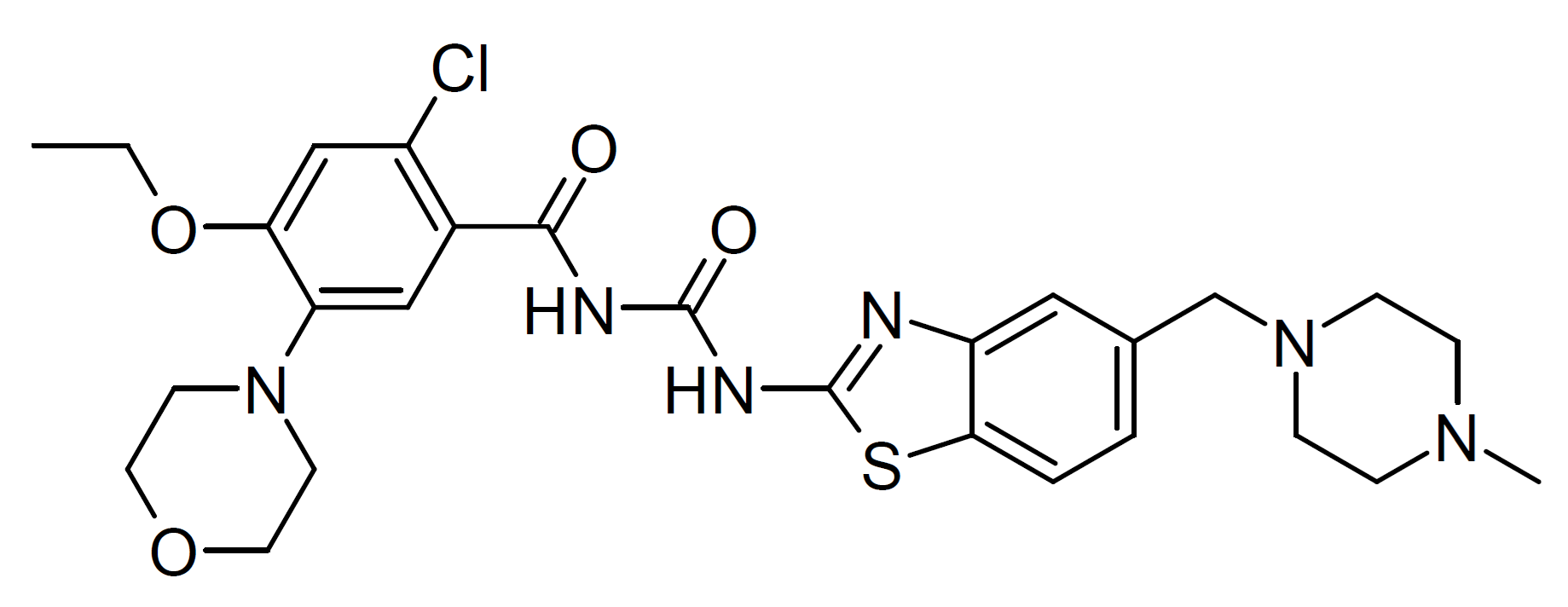

Identifiers
- IUPAC name: 2-chloro-4-ethoxy-5-(morpholin-4-yl)-N-[(5-[(4-methylpiperazin-1-yl)methyl]-1,3-benzothiazol-2-yl)carbamoyl]benzamide

Chemical and physical data
- Formula: C_{27}H_{33}ClN_{6}O_{4}S
- Molar mass: 573.11 g·mol^{−1}
- 3D model (JSmol): Interactive image
- SMILES: O=C(Nc1sc2ccc(CN3CCN(C)CC3)cc2n1)NC(=O)c1cc(N2CCOCC2)c(OCC)cc1Cl
- InChI: InChI=InChI=1S/C27H33ClN6O4S/c1-3-38-23-16-20(28)19(15-22(23)34-10-12-37-13-11-34)25(35)30-26(36)31-27-29-21-14-18(4-5-24(21)39-27)17-33-8-6-32(2)7-9-33/h4-5,14-16H,3,6-13,17H2,1-2H3,(H2,29,30,31,35,36); Key:CHVMFPVXGKKDEC-UHFFFAOYSA-N

AZ'5538 is an experimental drug which acts as a potent and selective agonist for the Hydroxycarboxylic acid receptor 1 (GPR81). It has been used to investigate the role of GPR81 in the regulation of blood lipid profile and blood pressure.
