= MK6892 =

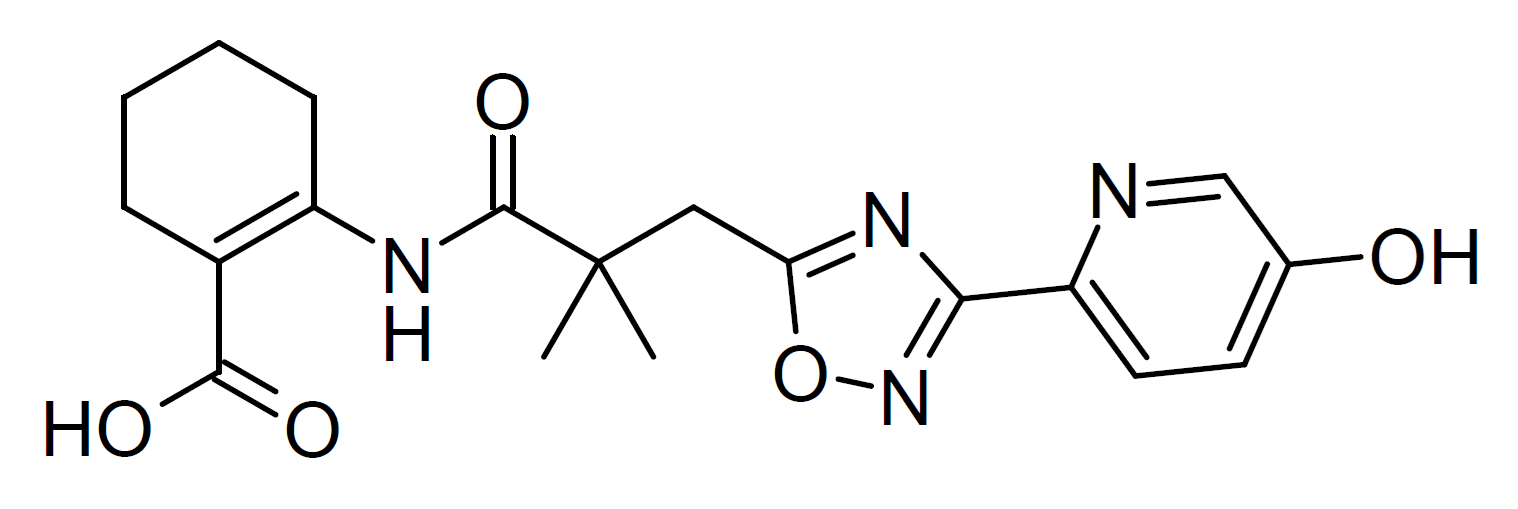

Identifiers
- IUPAC name: 2-[[3-[3-(5-hydroxypyridin-2-yl)-1,2,4-oxadiazol-5-yl]-2,2-dimethylpropanoyl]amino]cyclohexene-1-carboxylic acid
- CAS Number: 917910-45-3
- PubChem CID: 135416394
- IUPHAR/BPS: 5788
- ChemSpider: 24664360
- UNII: PH9ZB6IRW0
- ChEMBL: ChEMBL1086657

Chemical and physical data
- Formula: C_{19}H_{22}N_{4}O_{5}
- Molar mass: 386.408 g·mol^{−1}
- 3D model (JSmol): Interactive image
- SMILES: CC(C)(CC1=NC(=NO1)C2=NC=C(C=C2)O)C(=O)NC3=C(CCCC3)C(=O)O
- InChI: InChI=1S/C19H22N4O5/c1-19(2,18(27)21-13-6-4-3-5-12(13)17(25)26)9-15-22-16(23-28-15)14-8-7-11(24)10-20-14/h7-8,10,24H,3-6,9H2,1-2H3,(H,21,27)(H,25,26); Key:CJHXBFSJXDUJHP-UHFFFAOYSA-N

MK6892 is an experimental drug which acts as a potent and selective agonist for the Hydroxycarboxylic acid receptor 2 (GPR109A). It has been investigated for lowering blood lipid levels and potential applications in the treatment of colon cancer.
