= GSK256073 =

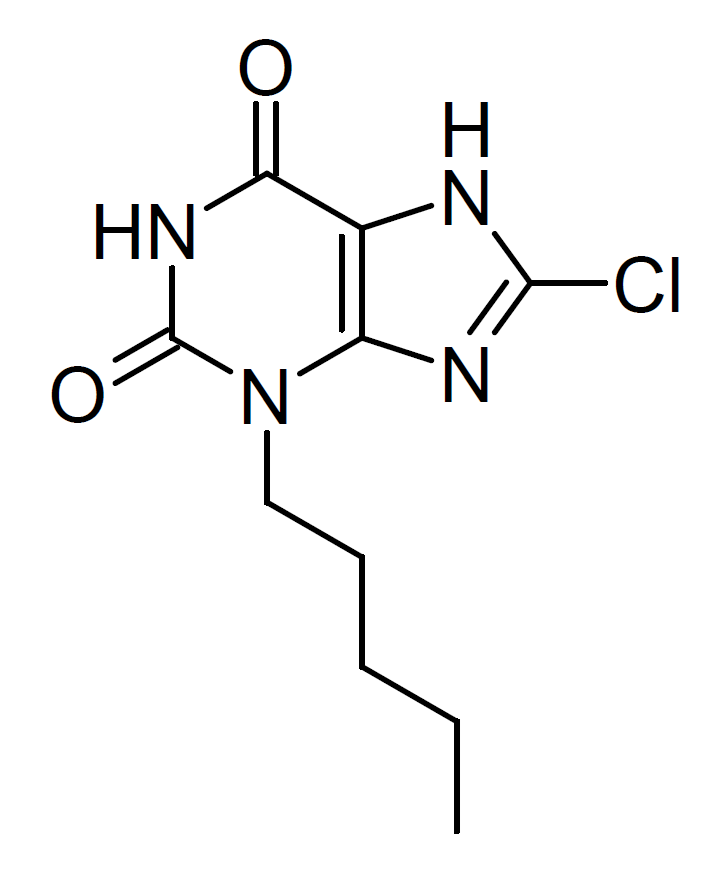

Identifiers
- IUPAC name: 8-chloro-3-pentyl-7H-purine-2,6-dione
- CAS Number: 862892-90-8
- PubChem CID: 46215799
- IUPHAR/BPS: 8470
- ChemSpider: 35033254
- UNII: 1VI94C980K
- ChEMBL: ChEMBL3730241

Chemical and physical data
- Formula: C_{10}H_{13}ClN_{4}O_{2}
- Molar mass: 256.69 g·mol^{−1}
- 3D model (JSmol): Interactive image
- SMILES: CCCCCN1C2=C(C(=O)NC1=O)NC(=N2)Cl
- InChI: InChI=1S/C10H13ClN4O2/c1-2-3-4-5-15-7-6(12-9(11)13-7)8(16)14-10(15)17/h2-5H2,1H3,(H,12,13)(H,14,16,17); Key:CGAMDQCXAAOFSR-UHFFFAOYSA-N

GSK256073 is an experimental drug which acts as a potent and selective agonist for the Hydroxycarboxylic acid receptor 2 (GPR109A). It reduces blood sugar levels and was trialed unsuccessfully as a potential treatment for diabetes, but continues to be used for research into the function of the HCA2 receptor.
