= Evolutionary approaches to schizophrenia =

Evolutionary explanations of schizophrenia

Schizophrenia is a mental disorder characterized by persistent hallucinations, delusions, paranoia, and thought disorder. These experiences are evident in multiple sensory modalities and include deviation in all facets of thought, cognition, and emotion. Compared to other psychological disorders like major depressive disorder (MDD) and generalized anxiety disorder (GAD), schizophrenia has significantly higher heritability. Schizophrenia has been found to present cross-culturally, and it almost always has 0.1% prevalence in a given population, although some studies have cast doubts on this. It has been hypothesized that schizophrenia is unique to human beings and has existed for a long time.

Schizophrenia has raised a perplexing question for evolutionary psychologists and anthropologists. Why has such a debilitating disorder persisted for so long, with such frequency? This paradox has been referred to as the schizophrenia enigma, and many evolutionary models have been created to explain it.

Evolutionary approaches reflect on how human genes can change over time. Under evolutionary pressures, certain phenotypes are favored, and this selection influences the frequency of genes that control these phenotypes. Evolutionary approaches have been used to try to explain the schizophrenia enigma. Widely accepted views see schizophrenia as either a disadvantageous byproduct of human evolution or an evolutionarily beneficial adaptation.

== Main explanations ==
There are several evolutionary theories related to schizophrenia spanning time from when Homo erectus gained control of fire onward to the modern day. The first theory related to schizophrenia is Byproduct theories. These theories portray the disorder as a consequence of other, separate evolutionary changes. One anthropologist putting forward this theory, Crow, states that schizophrenia is a result from incomplete hemispheric specialization due to selection of genes relating to language. While another scientist, Burns, follows that schizophrenia is related to modified cortical connectivity which is vital for the development of the 'social brain. Finally Horrobin argues that ancient mutations are what developed linguistic, creative and shamanic ability which in turn can potentially cause deficits in lipid metabolism or as it is termed in modern times Schizophrenia.

Another evolutionary theory which connects with the development of modern-day schizophrenia are Balance theories which hypothesizes that schizophrenia's negative aspects are balanced by benefits. These benefits yield valued personality traits or yet again shamanism a desired and mystic ability of the past. Though an evolutionary theory in its own, analysis of balance theory does not show this route as a possibility. Folklore accounts mention wise fools and clever madmen but do not connect such a characteristic to motifs combining psychosis and creativity, aspects believed to be borne from schizophrenia.

A third theory relating to schizophrenia is group selection theory which describes 'psychosis' alleles provide advantages to groups, outweighing any disadvantages. This theory then goes further and states that as a result of this grouping, humans that have specific genes replaced groups that lacked those genes. Additionally, this theory uses elements based on byproduct theories and balance theories. Environmental change theories also rely on schizophrenia-type alleles providing more benefits to our ancestors than to our modern selves. Some who support this theory say that it was modernization which actually generated the disorder itself. While the environmental change theory does explain how the development of schizophrenia survived through to modern times this claim as a whole through historical, anthropological and clinical perspectives the theory has been deemed inconclusive.

Random process theories are another explanation of Schizophrenia. At the center of this idea a polygenic mutation-selection balance theory describes mental disorders as continuous mutational effects on many genes underlying human behavior over time. This description of all mental disorders, including schizophrenia, implies that when mutations disrupt cognitive processes during evolutionary stages, the functions connected to that process are also affected by those mutations in later eras. This theory not only supplies how mental illness survived through to modern times but also how mental processes are affected as a whole by way of this theory. Additionally, this process theory gives mental disorders a kind of watershed quality where there are varying layers within mental processes that flows to 'downstream' processes which would also be affected by disruptions in cognitive functions 'upstream.'

Other hypotheses relating to schizophrenia include the idea that those with the disorder themselves possess some kind of 'physiological advantage' which includes resistance to injuries, resistance to various infections, enhanced healing abilities and even being less accident prone. These hypotheses are not well supported, as any advantages possessed by those with schizophrenia should be found in their behavior, not the genotype, and the fact of the matter is that selection works on phenotype rather than genotype. Another suggested hypothesis, the stress-induced neurodevelopment hypothesis, claims that those exposed to pre- and/or early neonatal environmental stress may have developed psychiatric disorders such as schizophrenia and major depressive disorder (MMD). The theory goes on further to explain that these disorders, spurred by stress before and after birth may have evolved and remained in the human genotype as a means of survival against adverse environments.

== Schizophrenia as a byproduct of human evolution ==
The disadvantageous-byproduct view hypothesizes that schizophrenia started to occur when humans diverged from primates. According to this view, schizophrenia symptoms are extreme versions of normal social behaviors. Symptoms of schizophrenia such as delusions are extreme versions of cognitive processes that can be greatly beneficial. Such symptoms that are at the undesirable extreme of normality, however, result in more harm than benefit.

Timothy Crow hypothesizes that schizophrenia is closely related to human language development. This hypothesis is mainly supported by the significant language dysfunction displayed in schizophrenics.

Another related model argues that schizophrenia results from certain inabilities to buffer the deleterious effects of mutations. This model of developmental instability is compatible with the diathesis–stress model.

For those who argue that schizophrenia and other frontal lobe disorders are connected to delayed cerebral maturation, this pathophysiological model explains schizophrenia as one unwanted extreme of normal variation.

== Schizophrenia as advantageous to individual, kin, and group ==
Contrary to the previous view, there are models rooted in theories that view schizophrenia as granting beneficial powers to patients, their kin, or their social groups. This view attempts to explain the prevalence and persistence of schizophrenia over time and across cultures. Researchers, Joseph Polimeni and Jeffrey Reiss, argue that the existence of schizophrenia in humans is not random, basing this argument on the fact that the 1% prevalence rate is higher than gene mutation rates. This view displays benefits that promote the fitness of individuals, kins, or groups and thus enhance chance of survival, in reference to Charles Darwin's argument of natural selection and the "survival of the fittest", presented in his book On the Origin of Species. Moreover, the evolutionary advantages mainly focus on the individual. The benefits of schizophrenia are likely to buffer the deficits of the disorder and thus balance the selective pressures.

=== Benefits to individuals ===
In 1964, Julian Huxley, Ernst Mayr, Humphry Osmond and Abram Hoffer theorized the first representation of the evolutionary aspects of schizophrenia. According to their complete research, they hypothesized that schizophrenia represented a genetic polymorphism with both advantageous and disadvantageous characteristics. Moreover, the authors inferred that reduced fertility in schizophrenic patients was because of higher resistance to harmful factors, including shock, allergies, and infection. However, this view has not been substantiated. In addition, the schizophrenia paradox is classified by the inconsistency between higher rates of schizophrenia and reduced fertility. From an evolutionary standpoint, the rates of schizophrenia surpass common mutation due to the fact that it maintains the genotype. Moreover, according to VL Nimgaonkar's argument of the fertility of schizophrenic patients, men specifically have malfunctions in their reproductive systems. Not every hypotheses agrees with the schizophrenia paradox, however, most evolutionary perspectives do concur with the inconsistency between the higher rates of schizophrenia and reduced fertility in patients.

Another related model suggests that certain traits in schizophrenia, including the tolerance of low levels of stimulation while being attentive, may have helped with developing territorial instincts, thus becoming advantageous to humans. However, Kellett fails to take into consideration all significant aspects of schizophrenia, including an evolutionary perspective of the different life-altering symptoms. Thus, referring to the social structure of Homo sapiens, hierarchical structures are of more importance in human societies than territorial ones.

=== Benefits to kin ===
More researchers support the idea that schizophrenia brings evolutionary benefits to kin by enhancing their physiological and psychological adaptiveness. In their scholarly journal, Robert Kuttner, Albert Lorincz, and Donald Swan argued that the favorable features of schizophrenia were of different social behaviors. They focused on the genetics of balanced polymorphism to theorize the prevalence of schizophrenia. For example, referring to the sickle cell anemia model, the deleted phenotypes do persist if the heterozygote has an advantage over its associated homozygotes. Thus, researchers hypothesize schizophrenia to be a homozygotic condition, and that asymptomatic heterozygotes are favored over average people. Individuals with active symptoms of schizophrenia are more likely to seclude themselves from others, avoiding circumstances that may lead to excess amounts of stress or anxiety. Based on conducted research, the authors theorized that there was not enough evidence to fully support that relatives of individuals with schizophrenia exhibited effective social adaptation. In addition, although the balanced polymorphism argument does not fully explain social behavioral characteristics, there are examples, such as sickle cell anemia, Tay-Sachs disease, and cystic fibrosis, that theorize the infectious agents.

Furthermore, one study in favor of this beneficial-to-kin model argues that female children of patients with schizophrenia have enhanced survival rates. However, male individuals did not receive any advantages or disadvantages from this model. Further research also conveyed that there was no survival advantages for children whose parents were experiencing symptoms of schizophrenia.

Similarly, Carter and Watts' study theorized a possible physiologic advantage of schizophrenia, that conveyed a decreased prevalence of virus infections among relatives of schizophrenic patients. The perceived connection between the mental illness and this advantage is possibly due to the genes associated with schizophrenia. However, criticism points to the failure to replicate such results.

This view of schizophrenia being advantageous partially corresponds to the public fantasy of mentally ill patients being tormented geniuses. In support of this, superior academic success among relatives of schizophrenic patients has been found. This suggests possible adaptive benefits. Criticism of this model mainly addresses the lack of evidence to suggest a creativity–mental illness linkage.

=== Benefits to groups ===
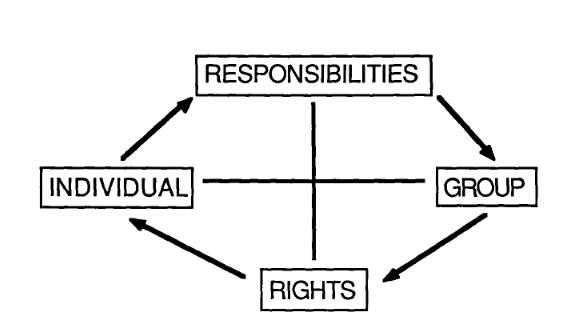
shows the idea there cannot be rights without responsibility or a social group for an individual to work with. Schizophrenics are often overtly social and typically work outside the status quo, creating uncertainty within socio-individual relationships

Anthony Stevens and John Price theorize the notion of the group-splitting hypothesis of schizophrenia, that all groups must split to maintain their cohesive structure. Many hypotheses connect schizophrenic symptoms to the characteristics seen in religious or spiritual leaders, such as Adolf Hitler or the Joan of Arc.

Polimeni and Reiss' group selection hypothesis of schizophrenia emphasizes the shamanism, or shaman-like behaviors, arguing that there is a need to consider the genetic root of such behaviors. One related hypothesis argues that schizophrenia helps maintain charismatic leaders who utilize symptoms, such as paranoia and delusions, to create new cultures. Due to the altruistic nature of leadership, schizophrenia is selected to be maintained and bring benefits to the social group. Polimeni and Reiss theorize reduced fertility in schizophrenic patients in comparison to the group-selection of honeybees since they rapidly multiply for survival.

== Sexual selection and sex differences in schizophrenia ==
Instead of viewing schizophrenia as a by-product of brain evolution, one model presents schizophrenia to be one extreme of a sexually selected fitness indicator. This model hypothesizes schizophrenia to be a side effect in sexual selection for certain traits.

Sexual selection concerns the mating choices of humans and other animals. These choices are based upon the principles of Charles Darwin's theory of Natural Selection, in which traits that increase likelihood of survival are chosen for, and organisms that are deemed most fit are sexually selected for. Traits that function as fitness indicators are those revealing potential benefits rooted in genetic qualities. When choosing mates, animals go for those with better fitness indicators to ensure better benefits for them and their offspring. These indicators can be morphological traits as well as behavioral traits. A peacock's tail and a nightingale's courtship songs are examples of the two traits. Sexual-selection studies have shown that male height, muscularity, and facial structure, and female breasts and buttocks are important indicators. Previously, Crow and Randall partially integrated the idea of sexual selection in their models to explain schizophrenia.

Fitness-indicator theory, a branch of sexual-selection theory, has been used to explain the evolutionary origins of schizophrenia. This model hypothesizes schizophrenia to be an extreme example of abnormal and undesirable mental and behavioral traits that function as fitness indicators. In this model, the fitness indicator related to schizophrenia is courtship ability, which involves verbal and behavioral aspects. Failure of developing this ability means impaired communication skills, which can be seen in patients with schizophrenia. Sexual selection is thus demonstrated within this model in that schizophrenia is correlated with reduced fertility in families in which this disorder is present. Yet, while this disorder does reduce the fertility rates in female schizophrenics, it is reduced three times more in male schizophrenics, which yields a potential explanation as to why there is a minimal amount of schizophrenic fathers within families. This sexual selection model, combined with the reduced rates of mate choice due to the extreme abnormality of the traits, should allow the disorder to be selected against and thus minimally represented within our population. Yet, the disorder remains moderately heritable, raising the question as to why it is still so present within humans, as altering explanations, such as mutation rates, fail to explain why the rate of schizophrenia remains so high. Shaner, Miller, and Mintz (2004) hypothesize that Schizophrenia involves many gene loci, and thus evolved as an extreme variant of fitness indicator through mate choice. According to this hypothesis, the extreme variant of mental fitness provided by this disorder describes an allele in which neurodevelopmental sensitivity to Darwinian measures of reproductive strength such as fitness and survival adaptability, are increased. Hence this allele was deemed the fitness indicator model of schizophrenia, as it describes why 'fitter' families are able to develop successful courting mechanisms, while less fit families, such as those with schizophrenics, represent a reduced reproductive and marriage rate.

Another theory debating the sexual selection model of schizophrenia differentiates between the sexual selection rates of schizophrenia between genders, alluding that the disorder presents differently in the male and female brains, and thus, generates diversity in hemispheric growth and explains the presence of psychosis remaining in the human race today (Crow, 1993). This theory hypothesizes that there is a difference in the onset of psychosis between the male and female genders, and this onset difference causes relation in a man to sexual dimorphism in the cerebral cortex. More specifically, this theory hypothesizes that the onset of psychosis in the male brain leads to the cortex developing more laterally, or asymmetrically, then a female with the same psychosis. This is important in that, since schizophrenia is often correlated with a basal level of intelligence within individuals, it becomes increasingly vital to examine the morphology of schizophrenic brains, as compared to brains without psychosis, to examine if there are physical changes underlying this lapse in intelligence. Findings within morphological studies on schizophrenia thus far has indicated that there is ventricular enlargement within a psychotic population, but that this finding was reported without evidence that this affects the bimodal distribution of the brain within experimental group, thereby the enlargement is not a characteristic of a particular subgroup (Crow, 1993). Theories explaining this tendency hypothesize that perhaps, similar to ventricular expansion in Alzheimer's-Dementia, that this expansion may be due to the tissue loss. Another thought revolves around the developmental aspects to the brain, in that, in childhood, the ventricles initially fill, and that a mutation or delay to this process may explain why the ventricles never reach normal size. This could indicate that there was an arrest in the process, potentially early termination of cerebral development. Alternative morphological outlooks, such as CT, MRI, and necroscopy, reported an overall finding of decreased brain size in schizophrenics. A probable cause is a decrease in gray matter, which presents another probable explanation as to why intelligence is decreased in this population.

This model plays out initially with the epidemiological issue between sex based onset time differences; While not a ton of individuals report cases of schizophrenia in pre-pubescent stages, around the age of 15 the amount of male individuals reporting the disorder, as compared to females, is heightened, and the sexes do not become equivalent in reporting rate until about age 30, where females surpass males, and both sexes decrease diagnosis rate linearly. Compared to other models, this one better explains the post-puberty onset of schizophrenia and cases frequently beginning at ages correlating to peak mating efforts. Evidence has been found that patients with schizophrenia have reduced marriage and reproduction rates.

== Other studies using evolutionary explanations ==
There are other studies that have evolutionary approaches to explaining schizophrenia, but their main focus is not explaining the schizophrenia enigma, which is based on acknowledging the consistent 1% prevalence rate across culture. Not all scholars agree to it.

Some scholars focus on explaining the variance in prevalence rates among certain societies. The biocultural approach is used to try to explain this variance. This model primarily looks at the interaction between genetic heritage and cultural influences and how it impacts the onset of schizophrenia. Studies like this still take into account evolutionary factors but do not accept the schizophrenia enigma.

== See also ==
- Evolution of schizophrenia
- Causes of schizophrenia
