= SCH 900271 =

Names
- Preferred IUPAC name 5-[3-(1-Methylcyclopropyl)propyl]-2H-pyrano[2,3-d]pyrimidine-2,4,7(1H,3H)-trione

Identifiers
CAS Number	915210-50-3
3D model (JSmol)	Interactive image
ChEMBL	ChEMBL2036958
ChemSpider	28518389
DrugBank	DB12433
PubChem CID	56950369
UNII	G2283XQ6VJ
CompTox Dashboard (EPA)	DTXSID00238609
- InChI: InChI=1S/C14H16N2O4/c1-14(5-6-14)4-2-3-8-7-9(17)20-12-10(8)11(18)15-13(19)16-12/h7H,2-6H2,1H3,(H2,15,16,18,19) Key: ARJKMWXLIHZLQZ-UHFFFAOYSA-N; InChI=1/C14H16N2O4/c1-14(5-6-14)4-2-3-8-7-9(17)20-12-10(8)11(18)15-13(19)16-12/h7H,2-6H2,1H3,(H2,15,16,18,19) Key: ARJKMWXLIHZLQZ-UHFFFAOYAP
- SMILES: O=C1C=C(CCCC2(CC2)C)C(C(NC(N3)=O)=O)=C3O1

Properties
Chemical formula	C_{14}H_{16}N_{2}O_{4}
Molar mass	276.292 g·mol^{−1}
- Except where otherwise noted, data are given for materials in their standard state (at 25 °C [77 °F], 100 kPa). Infobox references

SCH 900271 is a nicotinic acid derivative designed to treat dyslipidemia. It reduced plasma free fatty acids levels, but without significant flushing, a side effect common with niacin that limits its usefulness. SCH 900271 is currently in human trials.
