= Hydroxycarboxylic acid receptor 3 =

Protein-coding gene in the species Homo sapiens

HCAR3

Identifiers
- Aliases: HCAR3, GPR109B, HCA3, HM74, PUMAG, Puma-g, Niacin receptor 2, hydroxycarboxylic acid receptor 3
- External IDs: OMIM: 606039; MGI: 1933383; GeneCards: HCAR3

Gene location (Human)
Chr.	Chromosome 12 (human)
Band	12q24.31	Start	122,714,756 bp
Band	12q24.31	End	122,716,811 bp

Gene location (Mouse)
Chr.	Chromosome 5 (mouse)
Band	5|5 F	Start	124,001,633 bp
Band	5|5 F	End	124,003,562 bp
RNA expression pattern
Bgee	Human / Mouse (ortholog); Top expressed in: blood; granulocyte; gonad; spleen; monocyte; mucosa of esophagus; bone marrow; skin of abdomen; skin of leg; appendix / Top expressed in: granulocyte; esophagus; lip; skin of external ear; morula; subcutaneous adipose tissue; skin of back; transitional epithelium of urinary bladder; trachea; skin of abdomen; More reference expression data
BioGPS	n/a
Gene ontology
Molecular function	G protein-coupled receptor activity; signal transducer activity
Cellular component	integral component of membrane; cell junction; plasma membrane; integral component of plasma membrane; membrane
Biological process	G protein-coupled receptor signaling pathway; signal transduction
Sources:Amigo / QuickGO
Orthologs
Databases	NCBI: entry; OMA: entry
Species	Human	Mouse
Entrez	8843	80885
Ensembl	ENSG00000255398	ENSMUSG00000045502
UniProt	P49019	Q9EP66
RefSeq (mRNA)	NM_006018	NM_030701
RefSeq (protein)	NP_006009	NP_109626
Location (UCSC)	Chr 12: 122.71 – 122.72 Mb	Chr 5: 124 – 124 Mb
PubMed search
- Wikidata
View/Edit Human	View/Edit Mouse

Hydroxycarboxylic acid receptor 3 (HCA_{3}), also known as niacin receptor 2 (NIACR2) and GPR109B, is a protein which in humans is encoded by the HCAR3 gene. HCA_{3}, like the other hydroxycarboxylic acid receptors HCA_{1} and HCA_{2}, is a G_{i/o}-coupled G protein-coupled receptor (GPCR). The primary endogenous agonists of HCA_{3} are 3-hydroxyoctanoic acid and kynurenic acid. HCA_{3} is also a low-affinity biomolecular target for niacin (a.k.a. nicotinic acid).

== Ligands ==
Agonists

- IBC 293
