= IBC 293 =

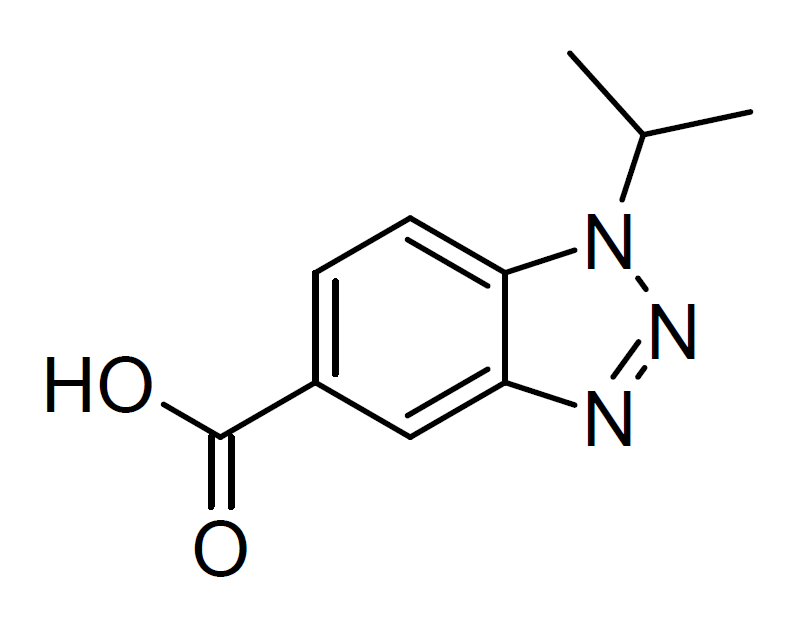

Identifiers
- IUPAC name: 1-propan-2-ylbenzotriazole-5-carboxylic acid
- CAS Number: 306935-41-1
- PubChem CID: 2736690
- IUPHAR/BPS: 1597
- ChemSpider: 2018348
- ChEBI: CHEBI:92275
- ChEMBL: ChEMBL381638
- CompTox Dashboard (EPA): DTXSID70371532

Chemical and physical data
- Formula: C_{10}H_{11}N_{3}O_{2}
- Molar mass: 205.217 g·mol^{−1}
- 3D model (JSmol): Interactive image
- SMILES: CC(C)N1C2=C(C=C(C=C2)C(=O)O)N=N1
- InChI: InChI=1S/C10H11N3O2/c1-6(2)13-9-4-3-7(10(14)15)5-8(9)11-12-13/h3-6H,1-2H3,(H,14,15); Key:RUTVRAJKELSHCC-UHFFFAOYSA-N

IBC 293 is an experimental drug which acts as a potent and selective agonist for the Hydroxycarboxylic acid receptor 3 (GPR109B), with good selectivity over the closely related HCA2/GPR109A receptor. It is used for studying the function of this receptor, and has been shown to activate neutrophils, demonstrating a role for HCA3 in immune system function.
