= Inotilone =

Names
- IUPAC name 2-[(3,4-Dihydroxyphenyl)methylidene]-5-methyl-3-furanone

Identifiers
CAS Number	906366-79-8
3D model (JSmol)	Interactive image
ChemSpider	26468922
EC Number	618-603-8
PubChem CID	53395281
UNII	CN7VXC9PKS
- InChI: InChI=1S/C12H10O4/c1-7-4-11(15)12(16-7)6-8-2-3-9(13)10(14)5-8/h2-6,13-14H,1H3 Key: NLZQGBCUKNUDED-UHFFFAOYSA-N
- SMILES: CC1=CC(=O)C(=CC2=CC(=C(C=C2)O)O)O1

Properties
Chemical formula	C_{12}H_{10}O_{4}
Molar mass	218.208 g·mol^{−1}
- Except where otherwise noted, data are given for materials in their standard state (at 25 °C [77 °F], 100 kPa). Infobox references

Inotilone is a chemical compound isolated from Phellinus linteus.
