= Acifran =

Names
- IUPAC name 5-Methyl-4-oxo-5-phenyl-4,5-dihydro-2-furancarboxylic acid
- Systematic IUPAC name 5-Methyl-4-oxo-5-phenyl-4,5-dihydro-2-furancarboxylic acid

Identifiers
CAS Number	72420-38-3
3D model (JSmol)	Interactive image
ChEMBL	ChEMBL278488
ChemSpider	46712
IUPHAR/BPS	1595
KEGG	D02753
PubChem CID	51576
UNII	B1X701S0MV
CompTox Dashboard (EPA)	DTXSID9045685
- InChI: InChI=1S/C12H10O4/c1-12(8-5-3-2-4-6-8)10(13)7-9(16-12)11(14)15/h2-7H,1H3,(H,14,15) Key: DFDGRKNOFOJBAJ-UHFFFAOYSA-N; InChI=1/C12H10O4/c1-12(8-5-3-2-4-6-8)10(13)7-9(16-12)11(14)15/h2-7H,1H3,(H,14,15) Key: DFDGRKNOFOJBAJ-UHFFFAOYAE
- SMILES: CC1(C(=O)C=C(O1)C(=O)O)C2=CC=CC=C2

Properties
Chemical formula	C_{12}H_{10}O_{4}
Molar mass	218.208 g·mol^{−1}
- Except where otherwise noted, data are given for materials in their standard state (at 25 °C [77 °F], 100 kPa). Infobox references

Acifran is a niacin receptor agonist.
