= FFAR2-FFAR3 receptor heteromer =

Receptor heteromer

free fatty acid receptor 2

Identifiers
- Symbol: FFAR2
- Alt. symbols: GPR43, FFA2R
- NCBI gene: 2867
- HGNC: 4501
- OMIM: 603823
- RefSeq: NM_005306
- UniProt: O15552

Other data
- Locus: Chr. 19 q13.1
Search for
- Structures: Swiss-model
- Domains: InterPro

free fatty acid receptor 3

Identifiers
- Symbol: FFAR3
- Alt. symbols: GPR41, FFA3R
- NCBI gene: 2865
- HGNC: 4499
- OMIM: 603821
- RefSeq: NM_005304
- UniProt: O14843

Other data
- Locus: Chr. 19 q13.1
Search for
- Structures: Swiss-model
- Domains: InterPro

The FFAR2–FFAR3 receptor heteromer is a receptor heteromer consisting of free fatty acid receptors, FFAR2 and FFAR3 protomers.

== Signal transduction ==
The signalling of the FFAR2-FFAR3 receptor heteromer is distinct from that of the parent receptor homomers. The FFAR2-FFAR3 heteromer displays enhanced intracellular calcium release and Arrestin beta 2 recruitment. The heteromer also lacks the ability to inhibit the cAMP-dependent pathway but gained the ability to induce P38 mitogen-activated protein kinases.
