= 4-CMTB =

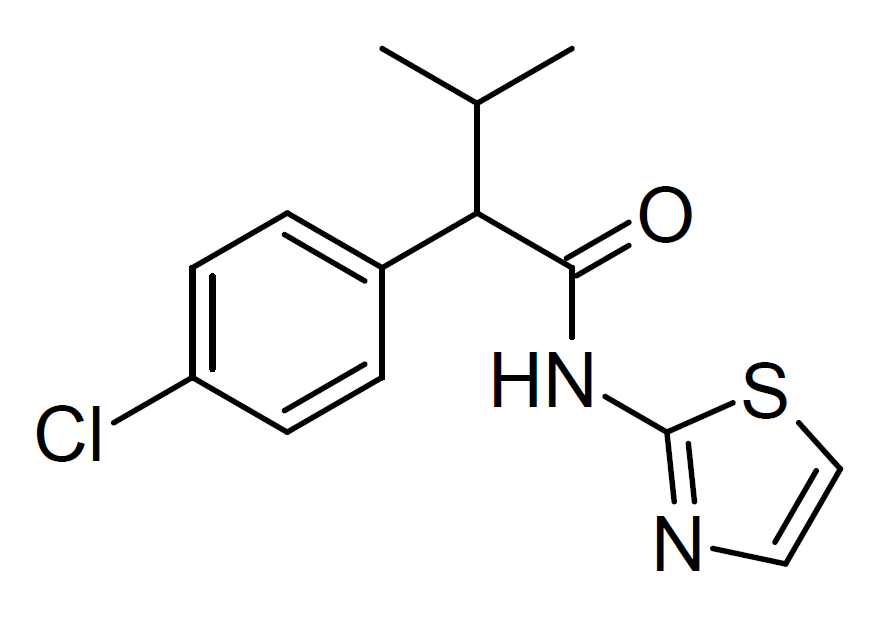

Identifiers
- IUPAC name: 2-(4-chlorophenyl)-3-methyl-N-(1,3-thiazol-2-yl)butanamide
- CAS Number: 300851-67-6
- PubChem CID: 4307629
- IUPHAR/BPS: 5500
- ChemSpider: 3513203
- ChEBI: CHEBI:113043
- ChEMBL: ChEMBL610463
- CompTox Dashboard (EPA): DTXSID701351934

Chemical and physical data
- Formula: C_{14}H_{15}ClN_{2}OS
- Molar mass: 294.80 g·mol^{−1}
- 3D model (JSmol): Interactive image
- SMILES: CC(C)C(C1=CC=C(C=C1)Cl)C(=O)NC2=NC=CS2
- InChI: InChI=1S/C14H15ClN2OS/c1-9(2)12(10-3-5-11(15)6-4-10)13(18)17-14-16-7-8-19-14/h3-9,12H,1-2H3,(H,16,17,18); Key:AZYDQCGCBQYFSE-UHFFFAOYSA-N

4-CMTB is an experimental drug which acts as a potent and selective agonist for the free fatty acid receptor FFAR2 (GPR43). It has antiinflammatory effects and has been used to study the role of FFAR2 in immune system function and the potential application of FFAR2 agonists in the treatment of conditions such as dermatitis and asthma.
