= GLPG0974 =

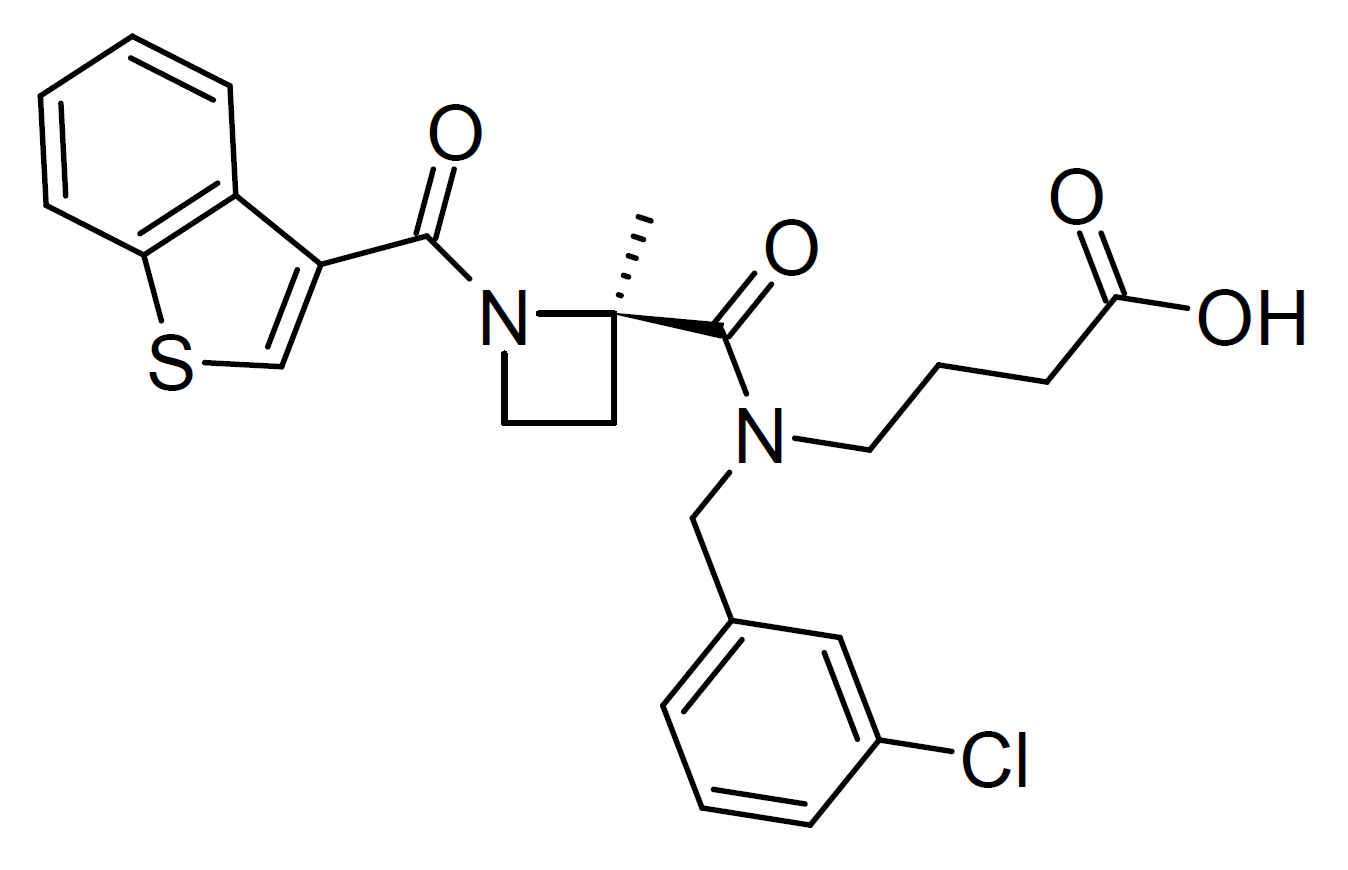

Identifiers
- IUPAC name: 4-[[(2R)-1-(1-benzothiophene-3-carbonyl)-2-methylazetidine-2-carbonyl]-[(3-chlorophenyl)methyl]amino]butanoic acid
- CAS Number: 1391076-61-1
- PubChem CID: 57520598
- DrugBank: DB15406
- ChemSpider: 35033253
- UNII: X7REK61AIS
- ChEMBL: ChEMBL3353541

Chemical and physical data
- Formula: C_{25}H_{25}ClN_{2}O_{4}S
- Molar mass: 485.00 g·mol^{−1}
- 3D model (JSmol): Interactive image
- SMILES: C[C@@]1(CCN1C(=O)C2=CSC3=CC=CC=C32)C(=O)N(CCCC(=O)O)CC4=CC(=CC=C4)Cl
- InChI: InChI=1S/C21H21ClN2OS/c1-21(2,3)18(15-9-11-16(22)12-10-15)19(25)24-20-23-13-17(26-20)14-7-5-4-6-8-14/h4-13,18H,1-3H3,(H,23,24,25)/t18-/m0/s1; Key:MPMKMQHJHDHPBE-RUZDIDTESA-N

GLPG0974 is an experimental drug which acts as a reasonably potent and selective antagonist for the free fatty acid receptor FFAR2 (GPR43). It was originally developed as a potential medication for ulcerative colitis, and while it was not developed as a medicine for this application it has remained widely used as a pharmacological tool compound for research into the FFAR2 receptor, as one of the relatively few selective FFAR2 antagonists available. Despite its antagonist action, it can also act as a positive allosteric modulator of FFAR2 under some conditions, which can complicate interpretation of results obtained using GLPG0974 in the presence of other FFAR2 ligands.
