= AR420626 =

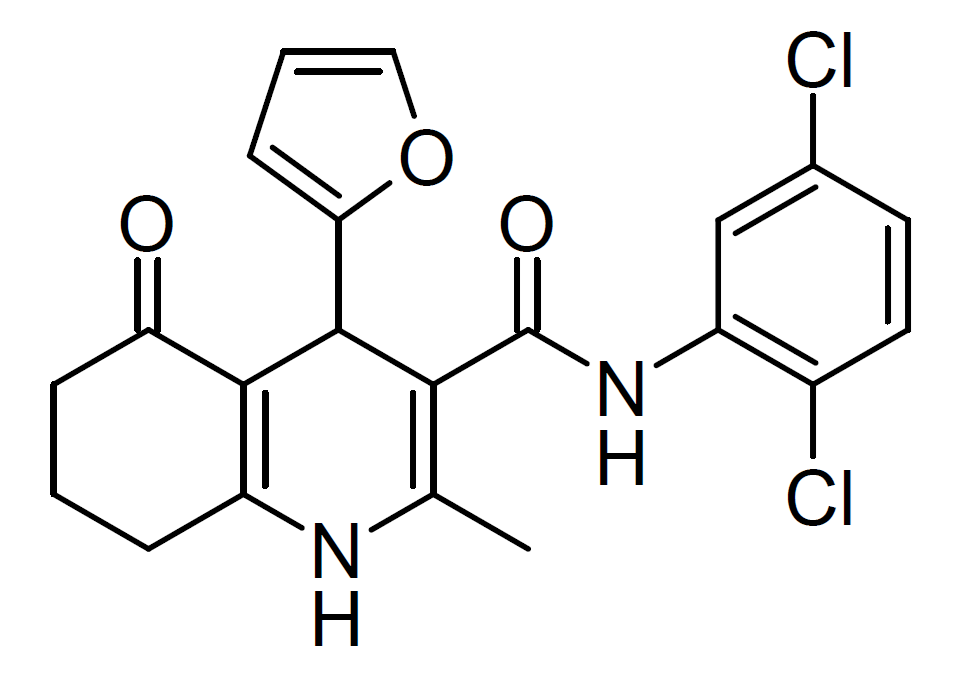

Identifiers
- IUPAC name: N-(2,5-dichlorophenyl)-4-(furan-2-yl)-2-methyl-5-oxo-4,6,7,8-tetrahydro-1H-quinoline-3-carboxamide
- CAS Number: 1798310-55-0
- PubChem CID: 91885415
- ChemSpider: 34975857
- ChEMBL: ChEMBL4564389

Chemical and physical data
- Formula: C_{21}H_{18}Cl_{2}N_{2}O_{3}
- Molar mass: 417.29 g·mol^{−1}
- 3D model (JSmol): Interactive image
- SMILES: CC1=C(C(C2=C(N1)CCCC2=O)C3=CC=CO3)C(=O)NC4=C(C=CC(=C4)Cl)Cl
- InChI: InChI=1S/C21H18Cl2N2O3/c1-11-18(21(27)25-15-10-12(22)7-8-13(15)23)20(17-6-3-9-28-17)19-14(24-11)4-2-5-16(19)26/h3,6-10,20,24H,2,4-5H2,1H3,(H,25,27); Key:GGTYQECCGLBHGS-UHFFFAOYSA-N

AR420626 is an experimental drug which acts as a reasonably potent and highly selective agonist for the free fatty acid receptor FFAR3 (GPR41). It has been used to research the role of FFAR3 in various disease processes such as diabetes, asthma, eczema and some forms of cancer, as well as regulation of gastrointestinal hormone release.
