= Free fatty acid receptor 2 =

Protein-coding gene in the species Homo sapiens

FFAR2

Identifiers
- Aliases: FFAR2, GPR43, free fatty acid receptor 2, FFA2
- External IDs: OMIM: 603823; MGI: 2441731; GeneCards: FFAR2

Gene location (Human)
Chr.	Chromosome 19 (human)
Band	19q13.12	Start	35,443,907 bp
Band	19q13.12	End	35,451,767 bp

Gene location (Mouse)
Chr.	Chromosome 7 (mouse)
Band	7|7 B1	Start	30,517,773 bp
Band	7|7 B1	End	30,523,200 bp
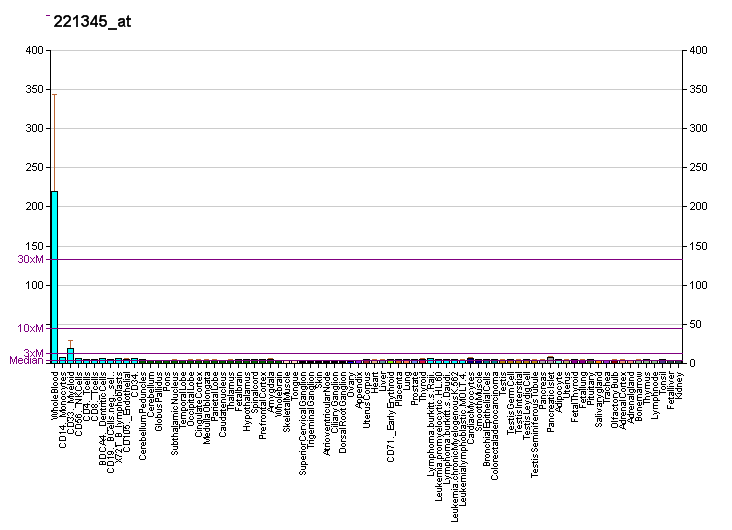
RNA expression pattern
Bgee	Human / Mouse (ortholog); Top expressed in: blood; granulocyte; periodontal fiber; monocyte; gonad; spleen; appendix; bone marrow; testicle; sural nerve / Top expressed in: granulocyte; Paneth cell; white adipose tissue; subcutaneous adipose tissue; islet of Langerhans; tibiofemoral joint; bone marrow; spleen; retinal pigment epithelium; zygote; More reference expression data
BioGPS	More reference expression data
Gene ontology
Molecular function	G protein-coupled receptor activity; signal transducer activity; protein binding; lipid binding
Cellular component	integral component of membrane; cell projection; membrane; plasma membrane; integral component of plasma membrane
Biological process	mucosal immune response; glucose homeostasis; immune system process; positive regulation of cytokine production involved in immune response; leukocyte chemotaxis involved in inflammatory response; lipid storage; cellular response to fatty acid; positive regulation of acute inflammatory response to non-antigenic stimulus; cell surface pattern recognition receptor signaling pathway; positive regulation of chemokine production; inflammatory response; regulation of peptide hormone secretion; fat cell differentiation; regulation of acute inflammatory response; signal transduction; G protein-coupled receptor signaling pathway
Sources:Amigo / QuickGO
Orthologs
Databases	NCBI: entry; OMA: entry
Species	Human	Mouse
Entrez	2867	233079
Ensembl	ENSG00000126262	ENSMUSG00000051314
UniProt	O15552	Q8VCK6
RefSeq (mRNA)	NM_005306; NM_001370087	NM_001168509; NM_001168510; NM_001168511; NM_001168512; NM_146187
RefSeq (protein)	NP_005297; NP_001357016	NP_001161981; NP_001161982; NP_001161983; NP_001161984; NP_666299
Location (UCSC)	Chr 19: 35.44 – 35.45 Mb	Chr 7: 30.52 – 30.52 Mb
PubMed search
- Wikidata
View/Edit Human	View/Edit Mouse

Free fatty acid receptor 2 (FFAR2), also known as G-protein coupled receptor 43 (GPR43), is a rhodopsin-like G-protein coupled receptor (GPCR) encoded by the FFAR2 gene. In humans, the FFAR2 gene is located on the long arm of chromosome 19 at position 13.12 (19q13.12).

FFAR2, like other GPCRs, is located on the cell membrane and is activated by binding specific ligands, regulating various cellular functions. FFAR2 is part of the free fatty acid receptor family, which also includes FFAR1 (GPR40), FFAR3 (GPR41), and FFAR4 (GPR120). FFAR2 and FFAR3 are activated by short-chain fatty acids (SCFAs), while FFAR1 and FFAR4 respond to long-chain fatty acids.

SCFAs, produced by intestinal bacteria, play a key role in various bodily functions by activating FFAR2. This receptor is implicated in regulating insulin and glucose levels, inflammation, fat tissue development, and certain cancerous and non-cancerous cell growth. Due to its role in these processes, FFAR2 has been studied for its potential involvement in conditions such as diabetes, inflammation, obesity, ketoacidosis, certain types of cancer, neurological diseases, and infections.

Therapies targeting FFAR2 are being developed to modulate its activity in these conditions, offering potential new treatments for diseases influenced by SCFAs.

== Activators and inhibitors ==
FFAR2 and FFR3 are activated primarily by short-chain fatty acids (SCFAs) that are 2 to 6 carbons in length (see length of fatty acids). In humans, acetic acid, which has 2 carbon atoms, is a strong activator of FFAR2 but very weak activator of FFAR3; propionic and butyric acids, which have 3 and 4 carbons, respectively, are strong activators of both FFAR2 and FFAR3; pentanoic acid, which has 5 carbon atoms, is a weak activator of FFAR2 but strong activator of FFAR3; and hexanoic acid, which has 6 carbon atoms, is a weak activator of FFAR3 but its effect on FFAR2 has not been reported. More recently, the ketone body fatty acid, acetoacetic acid, while not classified as a SCFA, has been shown to activate FFAR2 with a potency similar to acetic and propionic acids.

Many drugs have been developed that bind to and regulate FFAR2's activity. 1) MOMBA, Sorbate, and Compound 1 are orthostatic agonists, i.e., they bind to the same site as SCFAs to activate FFAR2. 2) Compound 58 and AZ1729 are positive allosteric agonists, i.e., they bind to FFAR2 at a site different than the orthostatic binding site and do not by themselves alter FFAR2 activity but enhance the ability of SCFAs and other FFAR2 orthostatic agonists to activate FFAR2. 3) CATPB and BTI-A-404 are reverse agonists, i.e., they bind to the same site as SCFAs but induce a response opposite to that induced by SCFAs.4) 4-CMTB and TUG-1375 are classified as FFAR2 agonists but studies are needed to define their binding sites on FFAR2. And 5) GLPG0974 is an allosteric antagonist, i.e., it inhibits human FFAR2 by binding to a site different than the SCFAs' binding site. GLPGO908 does not bind to or inhibit rodent FFAR2 but nonetheless GLPG0974 does have effects in rodents. Off-target actions such as these need to be but often are not considered in studies on the actions of SCFAs and FFAR2 drugs. Furthermore, SCFAs have many actions that do not involve FFAR2, e.g., they activate FFAR3, GPR109A (now termed hydroxycarboxylic acid receptor 2 or HCA2), and two other GPRs, Olfr78 and Olfr558. Most of the studies reported here include experiments in which the actions of SCFAs and FFAR2-regulating drugs in cells and animals are further tested in the cells and animals that have been made to express relatively little or no FFAR2 using gene knockdown or gene knockout methods, respectively. The effects of SCFAs and the drugs should be reduced or absent in cells and animals that under-express or lack FFAR2.

== Tissue distribution ==
Studies have detected FFAR2 protein and/or its messenger RNA (an indicator of FFAR2 protein expression) in the following cell types, cell lines, and tissues: 1) human and rodent enteroendocrine K cells, i.e., cells located in the epithelium of the small intestine; 2) human and rodent enteroendocrine L cells, i.e., cells located in the epithelium of the small intestine and colon; 3) human and rodent fat tissue and/or cultured fat cells; 4) cells in human and rodent pancreatic islets (these islets contain the beta cells and alpha cells that synthesize and secrete insulin and glucagon, respectively, into the blood); 5) cells in and/or derived from cells in the human or mouse spleen, lymph nodes, bone marrow, and blood (e.g., monocytes, lymphocytes, and neutrophils); 6) mouse and, based on indirect studies, human dendritic cells; 7) cells in or derived from cells in human and/or rodent kidneys, hearts, brains (e.g., hypothalamus), fetal membranes, and placentas; 8) cells in the taste buds' lingual papillae of human tongues; 9) mouse renal arteries, aortas, and iliac arteries; 10) various human cell lines including SW480, SW620, HT-29, and T84 colon cancer cells, NCI-H716 colon cancer cells that have a lymphoblast morphology, Caco-2 colorectal cancer cells, Hutu-80 duodenal cancer cells, SW872 liposarcoma cells, MDA-MB-231, MDA-MB-436, and MCF7 breast cancer cells, Huh7 and JHH-4 liver cancer cells, THP-1 acute myeloid leukemia cells, U937 acute promyelocytic leukemia cells, and K562 myelogenous leukemia cells; and 11) the various mouse and rat cell lines discussed below. FFAR2 is also expressed in a wide range of tissues in other animals such as cows, pigs, sheep, cats, and dogs.

== Formation of short chain fatty acids ==
The oral administration of glucose elicits a much greater rise in blood insulin levels and a much lower rise in blood glucose levels than those elicited by intravenous glucose infusions. This difference, termed the incretin effect, is due to the activation of FFAR2-bearing intestinal cells by the short chain fatty acids (SCFAs) that intestinal bacteria excrete. The microbiotas inside the small intestine and colon of animals and humans consist of a wide range of microorganisms and viruses. The microorganisms ingest the food their hosts consume including soluble dietary fibers, e.g., resistant starch, xanthan gum, and inulin, all three of which are resistant to the hosts' digestive enzymes. Certain microorganisms (e.g., anaerobic bacteria), ferment these dietary fibers to form and then excrete SCFAs (primarily acetic, propionic, and butyric acids). The relative levels of these three SCFAs in the intestines of humans are about 60:20:20, respectively. Intestinal SCFAs activate FFAR2-bearing cells in the nearby intestinal walls and also enter the blood circulation to activate FFAR2-bearing cells in distant tissues. SCFAs may also be made and released by the bacteria and/or host cells in tissue that contain bacterial infections.

== Clinical significance ==
=== Diabetes ===
==== Type 2 ====
The SCFAs excreted by the soluble dietary fiber-consuming bacteria in the intestine activate FFAR2 on nearby intestinal L-cells. This stimules these cells to secrete GLP-1 (i.e., glucagon-like peptide-1) and PYY (i.e., peptide YY) into the blood. GLP-1 stimulates pancreatic beta cells to secrete insulin into the blood and inhibits pancreatic alpha cells from secreting glucagon into the blood. Since insulin causes cells to take up blood glucose and glucagon causes the liver to release glucose into the blood, FFAR2 activation of L cells lowers blood glucose levels. In addition, PYY and GLP-1 reduce appetite and food consumption. The excreted SCFAs also activate FFAR2 on nearby intestinal K cells to simulate their secretion of GIP (i.e., glucose-dependent insulinotropic polypeptide). GIP stimulates insulin secretion but, perhaps paradoxically, also stimulates glucagon secretion; however, the net effect of GIP is to reduce blood glucose levels. GIP also slows gastric motility. In addition, both GLP-1 and GIP protect pancreatic beta cells from dying by apoptosis (see programmed cell death). The SCFAs excreted by the gut microorganisms also pass through the intestinal epithelium to enter the blood stream and activate FFAR2 on cells located in distant tissues such as pancreas beta cells and adipose tissue fat cells.

Individuals with type 2 diabetes, particularly in advanced cases, have nearly completely lost the incretin effect. A study treated non-diabetic, healthy men with the GLP-1 receptor antagonist (i.e., blocker of receptor activation) exendin(9-39)NH2a (also termed avexitide), the GIP receptor antagonist GIP(3-30)NH2, or both antagonists and challenged them with an oral glucose tolerance test. Men treated with either agent responded to the tolerance test with modest decreases in blood insulin levels and modest increases in blood glucose levels. However, men treated with both antagonists responded with very low insulin and very high glucose blood levels: their responses were similar to those in individuals with type 2 diabetes. This study shows that 1) the stimulation of the FFAR2 on K and L cells by SCFAs underlies the differences between oral and intravenous glucose challenges defined by the incretin effect and 2) FFAR2 functions to regulate blood insulin and glucose levels. This does not prove that type 2 diabetes is a FFAR2-incretin disease: post-feeding secretion of the incretins (i.e., GLP-1 and GIP) is impaired in type 2 diabetes, but the impairment appears to result primarily from decreases in the responsiveness of pancreas alpha cells to GLP-1. This conclusion is supported by studies showing that type 2 diabetic individuals who are treated with large amounts of GLP-1 and challenged with intravenous glucose show changes in blood insulin and glucose levels that are similar to those in non-diabetic individuals. Indeed, GLP-1 agonists, e.g., Dulaglutide, and a first-in-kind GLP-1 and GIP agonist, Tirzepatide, are used to treat type 2 diabetes.

==== Type 1 ====
Ffar2 gene knockout mice (i.e., mice that have had their Ffar2 genes removed or inactivated) have decreased pancreatic beta cell masses at birth and throughout adulthood but do not develop diabetes. However, they do develop defective insulin secretion, glucose intolerance (a prediabetic condition in humans manifested by elevated blood glucose levels), and obesity. This mouse model has some but not all of the features found in human type 1 diabetes. In particular, human type 1 diabetes is at least partly a genetically predisposed autoimmune disease in which an individual's immune system causes inflammation in their pancreatic islets that injures their beta, alpha, and other cells. Non-obese Diabetic mice, i.e., NOD mice, may be a more appropriate model of the human disease. These mice are genetically predisposed to develop tissue-damaging inflammation in their pancreatic islets, insulin insufficiency, and overt diabetes. NOD mice fed a HAMSA or HAMSB diet (i.e., prebiotic diets which cause high intestinal levels of acetic acid or butyric acid, respectively), were partially protected and mice fed a combination of the two diets were fully protected from developing diabetes. Notably, Ffar2 gene knockout NOD mice had far more pancreatic islet inflammation and far less protection from becoming diabetic by either of these diets. Finally, a study of children with pre-type 1 diabetes (base on their having antibodies against multiple pancreatic islet antigens) found that children who had low levels of SCFA-producing intestinal bacteria had a higher risk of progressing to type 1 diabetes than those with higher intestinal levels of these bacteria. These results suggest that the activation of FFAR2 by intestinal SCFAs suppresses the development of type 1 diabetes in mice and humans and may do so by reducing the inflammation with injures pancreatic islet cells.

=== Inflammation ===
FFAR2 is expressed in various cells involved in the development of inflammatory responses such as neutrophils, monocytes, macrophages, dendritic cells, regulatory T cells, and T helper cells. FFAR2 often appears to be involved in suppressing these cells' pro-inflammatory actions and thereby the development of inflammation. For example: 1) compared to control mice, Ffar2 gene knockout mice developed more severe and unresolving inflammation in colitis, arthritis, peritonitis, and asthma models of inflammation; 2) germ-free mice, which lack intestinal SCFAs, likewise had severer disease in these colitis, arthritis, and asthma models; 3) in a dextran sulphate sodium-induced model of colitis, Ffar2 gene knockout mice developed more severe disease than control mice; 4) two studies found that normal mice but not Ffar2 gene knockout mice fed a prebiotic diet that produces higher intestinal levels of SCFAs were protected from developing allergic responses to food; 5) the latter study also showed that the prebiotic diet was fully protective in Ffar3 gene knockout mice (allergic responses are a subtype of the inflammatory reactions); and 6) studies in mice and humans suggest that FFAR2 is involved in suppressing the pancreatic islet inflammation underlying the development of type 1 diabetes (see previous section). Other studies, however, have reported that FFAR2 promotes inflammation. Two studies found that FFAR2 gene knockdown mice had less severe disease in a dextran sulphate sodium-induce colitis model compared to control mice. And, another study reported that the level of FFAR2 messenger RNA in circulating blood monocytes was elevated in humans with gout compared to those who did not have gout and rose further during flare-ups of their disease; the study suggested that FFAR2 is involved in triggering gout flare-ups. Notably, a study based on the premise that FFAR2 promotes inflammation examined the effect of GLPG0974, a potent allosteric antagonist inhibitor of FFAR2, on patients with the inflammatory disease ulcerative colitis. The study progressed through phase I and II clinical studies that found the drug to be safe (i.e., non-toxic) but ineffective in reducing mild to moderate ulcerative colitis (further development of GLPG609 was terminated). While most studies suggest that FFAR2 suppresses human and mouse inflammation, further studies are needed to determine if and why FFAR2 promotes some types of inflammation.

=== Adipogenesis, obesity, lipolysis, and ketogenesis ===
==== Angiogenesis and obesity ====
Studies have disagreed about the effects of FFAR2 on adipogenesis (i.e., formation of fat cells and fat tissue from precursor cells) as well as on the development of obesity. The inconsistencies reported by different research groups need to be resolved through further research in order to develop a clear picture of the actions that FFAR2 has on adipogenesis and obesity.

==== Lipolysis ====
Numerous studies have shown that SCFAs and FFAR2-activating drugs inhibit the lipolysis (i.e., enzymatic hydrolytic breakdown of cellular triglycerides into their component fatty acids and glycerol) in mice and their cultured fat cells. For example: acetic and propionic acids inhibited lipolysis in mice (as defined by reducing their fatty acid blood levels) as well as their isolated cultured fat cells but did not do so in Ffar2 gene knockout mice or their isolated fat cells. There have been very few studies on FFAR2 and lipolysis in humans. Two studies reported that acetic acid suppressed fatty acid blood levels in humans but did not determine if this effect involved FFAR2. Note that in a mouse model of severe stress, i.e., starvation, FFAR2 activation stimulated lipolysis (see next section on Ketogenesis and ketoacidosis). FFAR2 appears to have very different effects on lipolysis in mice depending on their energy conditions and nutritional status. While SCFAs and FFAR2 have been suggested to stimulate lipolysis in humans on low glucose diets (study described in section on Ketogenesis and ketoacidosis), the role of FFAR2 in this stimulation is unclear and requires further study.

==== Ketogenesis and ketoacidosis ====
Ketogenesis is a condition in which the liver releases ketone bodies, i.e., acetoacetic acid, beta-hydroxybutyric acid, and acetone, into the blood. This occurs when blood glucose levels are moderately low such as during sleep, fasting, dieting, pregnancy, and the first 28 days after birth (i.e., the neonatal period); this form of ketogenesis is associated with modest elevations in the blood levels of the ketone bodies and, due to their increased release from adipose tissue, fatty acids. The circulating ketone bodies and fatty acids serve as nutrients to sustain the functioning of critical organs such as muscle, heart, kidney and brain when blood glucose levels are too low to do so. During serious stress conditions such as diabetic ketoacidosis and non-diabetic ketoacidosis due to excessive alcohol intake, medications, toxins, or starvation (see ketogenesis sections on each of these conditions), blood glucose levels are very low, blood ketone bodies and fatty acid levels are very high, and (due to the high blood levels of the ketone bodies and fatty acids) the blood is extremely acidic. This condition, a form of acidosis termed ketoacidosis, is life-threatening. In addition to serving as a tissue nutrient and blood acidifier, one of the circulating ketone bodies appears to have another function: acetoacetic acid activates FFAR2. In a mouse model of starvation-induced ketogenesis: 1) the plasma concentration of acetoacetate was markedly increased in wild-type as well as Ffar2 gene knockout mice while at the same time plasma levels of acetic, propionic, and butyric acids were, as a consequence of starvation, far below those that would activate FFAR2; 2) plasma free fatty acid levels were elevated in wild type but not Ffar2 gene knockout mice; 3) fat tissue weight was significantly higher in Ffar2 gene knockout than wild-type mice; and 4) the lean body masses in the two groups of mice were comparable. These results suggest that in mice the acetoacetic acid-induced activation of FFAR2 on fat cells stimulates lipolysis and thereby the rises in plasma fatty acid levels that occur in mild and severe ketoacidosis. Thus, FFAR2 appears to have a physiological role in mild but a pathological role in severe ketogenesis in mice. The acetoacetic acid-FFAR2-lipolysis linkage may occur in humans. Ketogenic diets i.e., low-carbohydrate diets, have been used to treat various neurological diseases. Individuals on these diets develop a mild form of ketogenesis consisting of moderately high blood levels of the ketone bodies and fatty acids. The increased fatty acid levels of individuals on these diets may be due to the stimulation of lipolysis by acetoacetic acid-induced activation of FFAR2 on their fat cells. High blood levels of beta-hydroxybutyric acid may activate hydroxycarboxylic acid receptor 2 on fat cells to similarly cause elevated fatty acid blood levels. Further studies are needed to support this role for FFAR2 in elevating fatty acid blood levels in humans on the ketogenic diet.

=== Vascular disease ===
The infusion of a FFAR2-activating SCFA, i.e. acetic, propionic, or butyric acid, into mice causes short-term falls in their blood pressure. Similarly, patients undergoing hemodialysis that uses a hemodialysis solution containing acetic acid have an increased risk of becoming hypotensive compared to patients dialyzed with an acetic acid-free solution. Long-term oral intake of FFAR2-activating SCFAs also lower blood pressure in mice and humans. Furthermore, FFAR2 gene knockout mice developed perivascular fibrosis (which is an indicator of blood vessel disease), higher end-diastolic blood pressures, and higher pulse pressures. Mice lacking both FFAR2 and FFAR3 had exaggerated responses to hypertension; this seems to happen via changes to the gut epithelial barrier and activation of the immune system. Finally, in the angiotensin II–infusion model of hypertension, mice had reduced levels of FFAR2 in their kidney tissues compared to control mice and a study in humans reported that the levels of FFAR2 in the circulating white blood cells of hypertensive individuals was significantly lower than that in individuals with normal blood pressures. These findings suggest that FFAR2 functions to reduce blood pressure as well as hypertension induced vascular disease in mice and humans and support further studies to examine these relationships.

=== Cancer ===
Preliminary studies suggest that FFAR2 may be involved in some types of cancer. 1) One study found that FFAR2 levels were elevated in human stomach and colorectal cancers although another study reported that FFAR2 levels were markedly deceased in human colorectal cancer. These results suggest that FFAR2 may promote the development and/or progression of human stomach cancer but its impact on human colorectal cancer requires further study. 2) In a dextran sulfate sodium-induced model of inflammation-associated colon cancer, FFAR2 knockdown mice developed larger and more tumors than control mice. This study suggests that FFAR2 inhibits the development and/or progression of inflammation-associated colon carcinoma in mice; its role in human inflammation-associated colorectal cancer (e.g., colorectal cancer developing in ulcerative colitis) has not been clarified. 3) Compared to their normal lung tissues, the lung cancer tissues of 42 patients had lower levels of FFAR2 but not FFAR1, FFAR3, or FFAR4. 4) Butyric acid inhibited the proliferation of and triggered apoptosis in cultured human A549 lung cancer cells; further studies in A549 as well as H1299 human lung cancer cells found that propionic acid inhibited their stimulated migration, invasiveness, and colony growth in cell culture assays but did not do so in FFAR2 gene knockout A549 or H1299 cells. These results suggest that FFAR2 may inhibit the development and/or progression of human lung cancer. (Studies have also reported that SCFAs inhibit the proliferation and caused apoptosis in cultured human breast cancer MCF-7 and human bladder cancer NaB cells but neither study determined if their actions involved FFAR2.) Further studies are needed to confirm and broaden these preliminary findings and extend them to other types of cancer.

=== Nervous system ===
Microglia are the resident immune cells of the central nervous system (i.e., brain and spinal cord). They are key contributors to the development and maintenance of neural tissues and mediate inflammatory responses to, e.g., bacterial invasion as well as the pathological inflammations which underlie many neurological diseases. Studies have reported that compared to control mice, germ-free mice (which lack SCFAs in their gastrointestinal tracts) have increased levels of immature microglia throughout their brains; SCFA supplementation normalized the microglial cell maturity. Furthermore, Ffar2 gene knockout mice likewise had increased levels of immature microglia throughout their brains. These studies suggest that FFAR2 is required for the maturation, and therefore functionality, of the microglia in mice. Since mouse microglial cells do not express FFAR2, the FFAR2-bearing cells responsible for the maturation and thereby functionality of the mouse's microglia are unclear.

Studies have suggested that promoting the intestinal microbiota's production of SCFAs may suppress the development and/or progression of various human neurological diseases, particularly Parkinson's disease, Alzheimer's disease, neuromyelitis optica, and multiple sclerosis. This linkage is thought to involve at least in part SCFA-induced suppression of the inflammation associated with these diseases. With somewhat less evidence, other studies have suggested that SCFRs may suppress the development and/or progression of human autism, schizophrenia, vascular dementia, strokes, pathological anxiety and depression disorders, behavioral and social communication disorders, and postoperative cognitive dysfunction. Some of these studies mention the possibility that SCFA-induced activation of FFAR2 suppresses these diseases and disorders but give no evidence to support this. The studies often do suggest that the SCFAs act by various other mechanisms to achieve their neurological effects. Furthermore, the role of SCFAs in humans with these diseases may be unclear. For example, two extensive reviews found that studies on the role of intestinal SCFAs in multiple sclerosis patients were inconclusive. There is a need to define the precise roles of SCFAs, FFAR2, and the other proposed causal factors in these neurological diseases and disorders.

=== Infections ===
==== Bacterial ====
Studies have shown that bacterial infections of the human urinary tract, vagina (i.e., bacterial vaginosis), gums (i.e., periodontitis), and abscesses in various tissues are associated with high concentrations of SCFAs, especially acetic acid, at the infection sites or, in urinary tract infections, the urine. These SCFAs may be made and released by the bacteria and/or host cells in the infected areas. Several studies have suggested that SCFAs act through FFAR2 to suppress these infections. 1) Compared to control mice, Ffar2 gene knockout mice had more severe infections in models of Citrobacter rodentium, Klebsiella pneumoniae, Clostridioides difficile, and Streptococcus pneumoniae bacterial infections. 2) Injection of acetic acid into the peritoneum 1/2 hour before or 6 hours after injection of Staphylococcus aureus bacteria into the bloodstream of mice reduced signs of severe disease, the amount of body weight lost, and the numbers of bacteria recovered from the liver, spleen, and kidneys; these reductions did not occur in Fffar2 gene knockdown mice. And, 3) higher circulating blood cell levels of FFAR2 messenger RNA were associated with higher survival rates in patients with sepsis, i.e., disseminated bacterial infections, compared to patients with lower levels of blood cell FFAR2 messenger RNA. These studies suggest that FFAR2 reduces the severity of the cited bacterial infections in humans and mice and recommend further studies on the roles of FFAR2 in these and other bacterial infections.

==== Viral ====
Mice pretreated for 4 weeks with diets that raised their intestinal SCFAs levels had reduced viral levels and pulmonary inflammation during the course of respiratory syncytial virus infection; these reductions did not occur in Ffar2 gene knockout mice or mice pretreated with antibiotics to reduce their intestines' SCFAs levels. Thus, SCFA activated FFAR2 appeared to reduce the severity of this viruses infection in mice. Different results were found in a study examining influenza A virus's ability to enter and thereby infect human A549 lung cancer cells and mouse 264RAW .7 macrophages. Reduction of FFAR2 using gene knockdown methods reduced the virus's ability to enter into both cell types. Treating A549 cells with FFAR2 agonists, either 4-CMTB or compound 58, also inhibited the virus's entry into these cells. Analysis of this inhibition revealed that Influenza A virus entered these cells by binding to their surface membrane sialic acid receptors; this binding triggered endocytosis, i.e., internalization, of these cells' sialic acid receptors along with their attached viruses. A portion of the sialic acid receptor-bound virus also binds to and activates FFAR 2; this activation increased the endocytosis triggered by the virus's binding to the sialic acid receptors. 4-CMTB and Compound 58 acted to block the ability of the sialic acid-bound virus to enhance endocytosis.

== FFAR2-FFAR3 receptor heteromer ==
The FFAR2-FFAR3 protein dimer, also termed FFAR2-FFAR3 receptor heteromer, consists of single FFAR2 and FFAR3 proteins joined together. This dimer has been detected in monocytes isolated from human blood and macrophages that were differentiated from these monocytes (see monocyte differentiation into macrophages). Like other protein dimers, the FFAR2-FFAR3 protein dimer had activities that differed from each of its FFAR monomer proteins. However, FFAR2-FFAR3 dimers have not yet been associated with specific functions, clinical disorders, or clinical diseases.

== Ligands ==
Agonists

- 4-CMTB
- CFMB
- AZ1729
- TUG-1375

Antagonists

- CATPB
- GLPG0974

== See also ==
- Free fatty acid receptor
- Short-chain fatty acid
