= CF3-MQC =

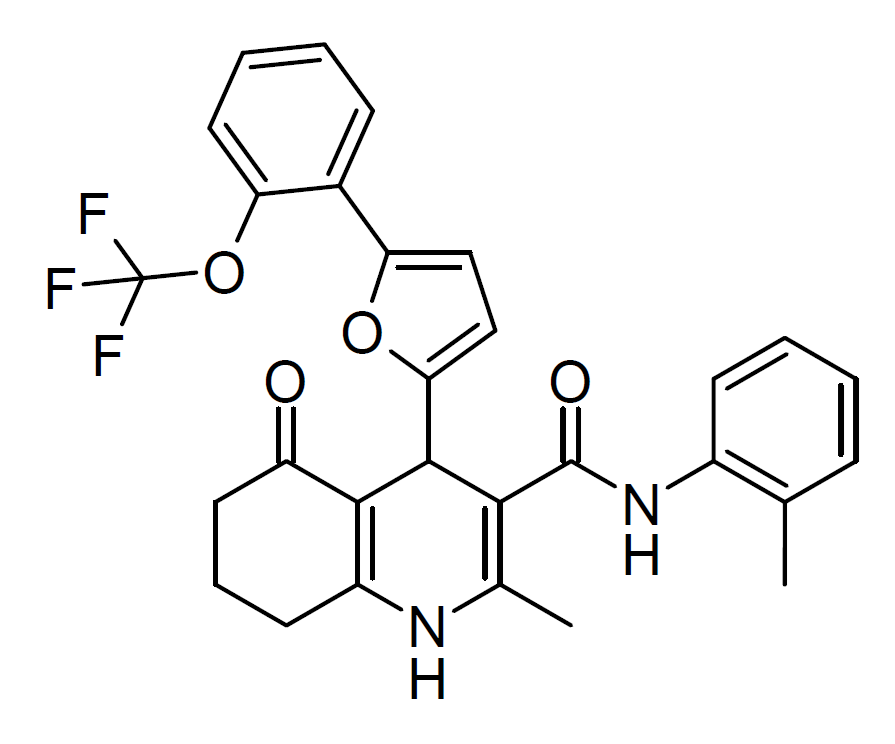

Identifiers
- IUPAC name: 2-methyl-N-(2-methylphenyl)-5-oxo-4-[5-[2-(trifluoromethoxy)phenyl]furan-2-yl]-4,6,7,8-tetrahydro-1H-quinoline-3-carboxamide
- PubChem CID: 11713371
- ChemSpider: 9888092

Chemical and physical data
- Formula: C_{29}H_{25}F_{3}N_{2}O_{4}
- Molar mass: 522.524 g·mol^{−1}
- 3D model (JSmol): Interactive image
- SMILES: CC1=CC=CC=C1NC(=O)C2=C(NC3=C(C2C4=CC=C(O4)C5=CC=CC=C5OC(F)(F)F)C(=O)CCC3)C
- InChI: InChI=1S/C29H25F3N2O4/c1-16-8-3-5-10-19(16)34-28(36)25-17(2)33-20-11-7-12-21(35)26(20)27(25)24-15-14-22(37-24)18-9-4-6-13-23(18)38-29(30,31)32/h3-6,8-10,13-15,27,33H,7,11-12H2,1-2H3,(H,34,36); Key:UZXHFTMRTRONRF-UHFFFAOYSA-N

CF3-MQC is an experimental drug developed by Arena Pharmaceuticals, which acts as a reasonably potent and highly selective antagonist for the free fatty acid receptor FFAR3 (GPR41), and is used for research into the function of this receptor. It is unclear whether CF3-MQC is the same compound as AR399519, the only other synthetic FFAR3 antagonist currently available, as while they are both cited to the same 2006 patent which claims only six closely related example structures as FFAR3 antagonists, the structure of AR399519 is not disclosed in the published sources.
