= CFMB (drug) =

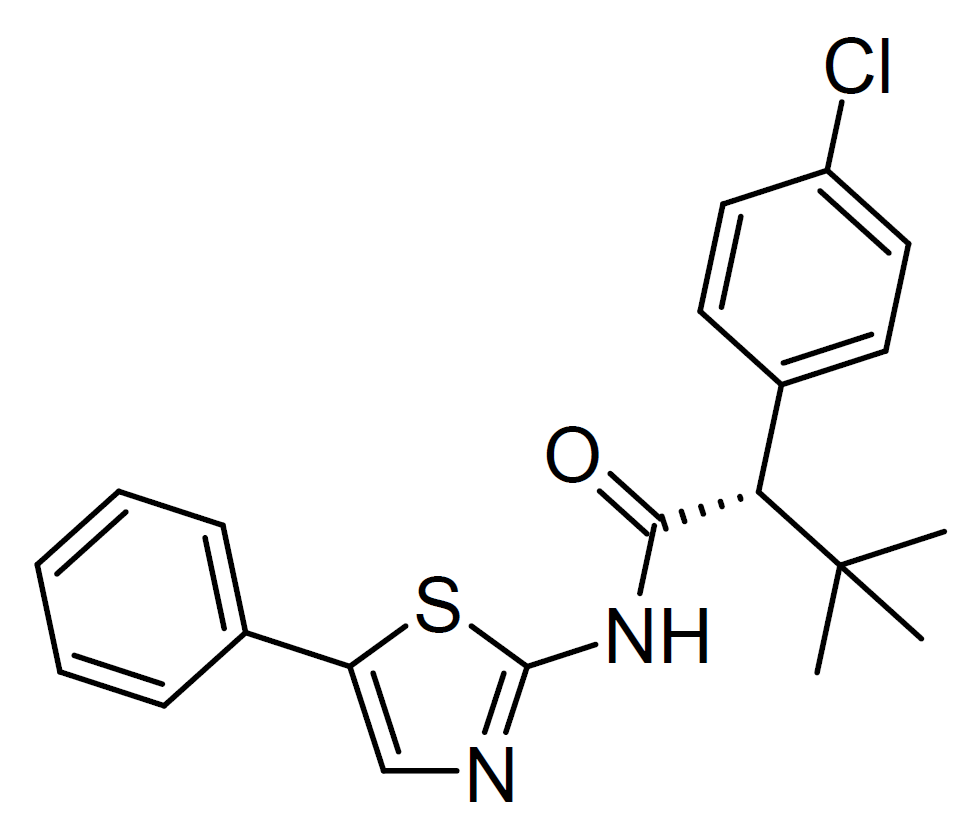

Identifiers
- IUPAC name: (2S)-2-(4-chlorophenyl)-3,3-dimethyl-N-(5-phenyl-1,3-thiazol-2-yl)butanamide
- CAS Number: 1208552-99-1
- PubChem CID: 46226294
- ChemSpider: 24656891
- ChEMBL: ChEMBL607315

Chemical and physical data
- Formula: C_{21}H_{21}ClN_{2}OS
- Molar mass: 384.92 g·mol^{−1}
- 3D model (JSmol): Interactive image
- SMILES: CC(C)(C)[C@@H](C1=CC=C(C=C1)Cl)C(=O)NC2=NC=C(S2)C3=CC=CC=C3
- InChI: InChI=1S/C21H21ClN2OS/c1-21(2,3)18(15-9-11-16(22)12-10-15)19(25)24-20-23-13-17(26-20)14-7-5-4-6-8-14/h4-13,18H,1-3H3,(H,23,24,25)/t18-/m0/s1; Key:ZVAPEFXSRDIMFP-SFHVURJKSA-N

CFMB is an experimental drug which acts as a reasonably potent and selective agonist for the free fatty acid receptor FFAR2 (GPR43) with only weak activity at the closely related FFAR3 receptor. It has antiinflammatory effects and has been used to study the role of FFAR2 in regulation of gastrointestinal hormone release and immune system function.
