= CATPB =

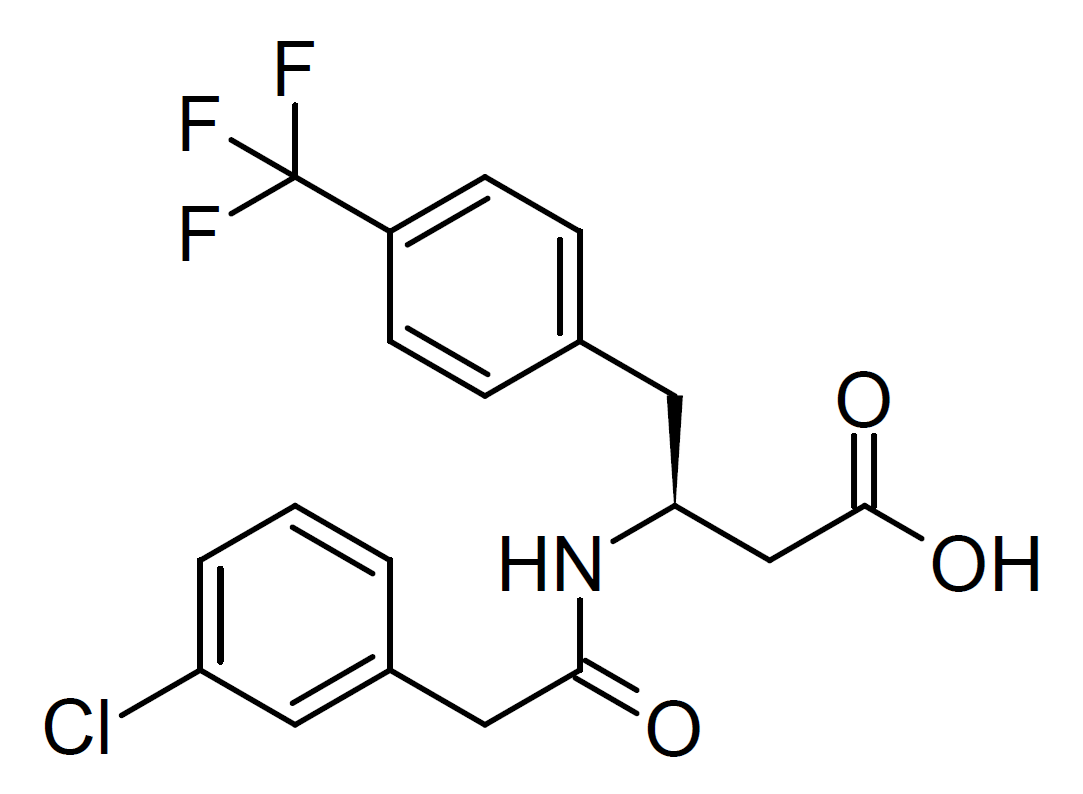

Identifiers
- IUPAC name: (3S)-3-[[2-(3-chlorophenyl)acetyl]amino]-4-[4-(trifluoromethyl)phenyl]butanoic acid
- CAS Number: 1322598-09-3
- PubChem CID: 53308747
- IUPHAR/BPS: 6487
- ChemSpider: 34980782
- ChEMBL: ChEMBL5412634

Chemical and physical data
- Formula: C_{19}H_{17}ClF_{3}NO_{3}
- Molar mass: 399.79 g·mol^{−1}
- 3D model (JSmol): Interactive image
- SMILES: C1=CC(=CC(=C1)Cl)CC(=O)N[C@@H](CC2=CC=C(C=C2)C(F)(F)F)CC(=O)O
- InChI: InChI=1S/C19H17ClF3NO3/c20-15-3-1-2-13(8-15)10-17(25)24-16(11-18(26)27)9-12-4-6-14(7-5-12)19(21,22)23/h1-8,16H,9-11H2,(H,24,25)(H,26,27)/t16-/m0/s1; Key:QOSIJVVNNGXEKE-INIZCTEOSA-N

CATPB is an experimental drug which acts as a potent and selective antagonist for the free fatty acid receptor FFAR2 (GPR43), and is used for research into the function of this receptor.
