= Free fatty acid receptor 3 =

Protein-coding gene in the species Homo sapiens

FFAR3

Identifiers
- Aliases: FFAR3, FFA3R, GPR41, GPR42, free fatty acid receptor 3
- External IDs: OMIM: 603821; MGI: 2685324; GeneCards: FFAR3

Gene location (Human)
Chr.	Chromosome 19 (human)
Band	19q13.12	Start	35,358,460 bp
Band	19q13.12	End	35,360,489 bp

Gene location (Mouse)
Chr.	Chromosome 7 (mouse)
Band	7|7 B1	Start	30,553,755 bp
Band	7|7 B1	End	30,555,603 bp
RNA expression pattern
Bgee	Human / Mouse (ortholog); Top expressed in: testicle; blood; islet of Langerhans; granulocyte; appendix; apex of heart; subcutaneous adipose tissue; monocyte; muscle layer of sigmoid colon; lactiferous gland / Top expressed in: islet of Langerhans; embryo; blastocyst; nerve trunk; proximal tubule; autonomic nervous system; right kidney; sympathetic nervous system; sympathetic ganglion; duodenum; More reference expression data
BioGPS	n/a
Gene ontology
Molecular function	G protein-coupled receptor activity; signal transducer activity; lipid binding
Cellular component	integral component of membrane; membrane; plasma membrane; integral component of plasma membrane
Biological process	mucosal immune response; regulation of norepinephrine secretion; adenylate cyclase-inhibiting G protein-coupled receptor signaling pathway; negative regulation of blood pressure; immune system process; positive regulation of cytokine production involved in immune response; regulation of hormone biosynthetic process; cellular response to fatty acid; positive regulation of acute inflammatory response to non-antigenic stimulus; positive regulation of chemokine production; inflammatory response; regulation of peptide hormone secretion; signal transduction; G protein-coupled receptor signaling pathway; regulation of insulin receptor signaling pathway
Sources:Amigo / QuickGO
Orthologs
Databases	NCBI: entry; OMA: entry
Species	Human	Mouse
Entrez	2865	233080
Ensembl	ENSG00000185897	ENSMUSG00000019429
UniProt	O14843	Q3UFD7
RefSeq (mRNA)	NM_005304	NM_001033316
RefSeq (protein)	NP_005295	NP_001028488
Location (UCSC)	Chr 19: 35.36 – 35.36 Mb	Chr 7: 30.55 – 30.56 Mb
PubMed search
- Wikidata
View/Edit Human	View/Edit Mouse

Free fatty acid receptor 3 (FFAR3, also termed GPR41) protein is a G protein coupled receptor (i.e., GPR or GPCR) that in humans is encoded by the FFAR3 gene (i.e., GPR41 gene). GPRs reside on cell surfaces, bind specific signaling molecules, and thereby are activated to trigger certain functional responses in their parent cells. FFAR3 is a member of the free fatty acid receptor group of GPRs that includes FFAR1 (i.e., GPR40), FFAR2 (i.e., GPR43), and FFAR4 (i.e., GPR120). All of these FFARs are activated by fatty acids. FFAR3 and FFAR2 are activated by certain short-chain fatty acids (SC-FAs), i.e., fatty acids consisting of 2 to 6 carbon atoms whereas FFFAR1 and FFAR4 are activated by certain fatty acids that are 6 to more than 21 carbon atoms long. Hydroxycarboxylic acid receptor 2 is also activated by a SC-FA that activate FFAR3, i.e., butyric acid.

== Gene ==
The human FFAR3 gene is located next to the FFAR2 gene at locus 13.12 on the long (i.e., "q") arm of chromosome 19 (location abbreviated as 19q13.12).

== Tissues distribution ==
Studies have reported that humans express FFAR3 in their: (a) enteroendocrine L cells and K cells of the intestines; (b) endothelium of blood vessels in the frontal cortex of the brain, pancreatic β-cells, and adipose. i.e., fat, tissue (but not in mouse adipose tissue); (c) the vascular endothelium of the myometrium, the epithelium of the amnion, chorion and placenta, and certain immune cells in these tissues of pregnant women; (d) the hippocampus of the brain; (e) sympathetic ganglia, i.e., autonomic ganglia of the sympathetic nervous system; (f) certain types of immune cells, i.e., blood monocytes (but not mouse monocytes), basophils, dendritic cells derived from human monocytes isolated from whole blood, and the tissues containing these blood cells, i.e., the bone marrow, spleen, lymph nodes, and thymus; and (g) alveolar macrophages, and macrophages in various other tissues; and (h) certain immortalised cell lines, i.e., MCF-7 breast cancer, HCT116 colorectal cancer, HEK293 embryonic kidney, U937 leukemic promonocyte, THP-1 leukemic monocyte, EoL-1 leukemic eosinophil, Jurcat leukemic T lymphocyte, MOLT-4 T lymphoblast leukemic, and HL60 acute myeloid leukemia cells (but only when the HL60 cells are pre-treated with phorbol 12-myristate 13-acetate to promote their cellular differentiation). As noted, the expression of FFAR3 in the cells and tissues of animals are not always the same as those in humans.

== Structure ==
Free fatty acid receptor 3 is a member of the G protein-coupled receptor (GPCR) superfamily, characterized by its seven transmembrane alpha-helices. FFAR3 shares significant sequence similarity with FFAR2 but exhibits distinct structural features that influence its ligand specificity and signaling. The receptor's orthosteric binding pocket is formed by transmembrane helices 3, 4, and 5, with key conserved residues such as Arg-185 (5.39), Arg-255 (7.35), His-140 (4.56), and His-242 (6.55) contributing to the binding and recognition of short-chain fatty acids (SCFAs) like acetate, propionate, and butyrate. Notably, FFAR3's binding cavity is more hydrophilic compared to its close relative FFAR2, which affects its ligand interactions. The second extracellular loop is important in modulating ligand selectivity and receptor activation. Additionally, the presence of a His-45 (2.40) is predicted to coordinate allosteric modulators.

The human FFAR3 and FFAR2 proteins consist of 346 and 330 amino acids, respectively, and share about a 40% amino acid sequence homology. The two FFARs have been found to form a heteromer complex (i.e., FFAR3 and FFAR2 bind to each other and are activated together by a SC-FA). When stimulated by a SC-FA, the cells expressing both FFAR3 and FFAR2 may form this heterodimer and thereby activate cell signaling pathways and mount responses that differ from those of cells expressing only one of these FFARs. The formation of GPR43-GPR41 heterodimers has not been evaluated in most studies and may explain otherwise conflicting results on the roles of FFAR3 and FFAR2 in cell function. Furthermore, SC-FAs can alter the function of cells independently of FFAR3 and FFAR2 by altering the activity of cellular histone deacetylases which regulate the transcription of various genes or by altering metabolic pathways which alter cell functions. Given these alternate ways for SC-FAs to activate cells as well as the ability of SC-FAs to activate FFAR2 or, in the case of butyric acid, hydroxycarboxylic acid receptor 2, the studies reported here focus on those showing that the examined action(s) of an SC-FA is absent or reduced in cells, tissues, or animals that have no or reduced FFAR3 activity due respectively to knockout (i.e., removal or inactivation) or knockdown (i.e., reduction) of the FFAR3 protein gene, i.e., the Ffar3 gene in animals or FFAR3 gene in humans.

== Function ==
=== Satiety ===
L cells are enteroendocrine cells, i.e., specialized cells that secrete hormones directly into the circulation. L cells reside in the epithelium of the gastrointestinal tract, particularly the terminal ileum and colon. They are stimulated to secrete PYY (also termed peptide YY) and GLP-1 (also termed glucagon-like peptide-1) by the SC-FAs that accumulate inside the intestines after feeding. L cells express FFAR3 and/or FFAR2. Ffar3 and Ffar2 gene knock out mice show reduced secretions of GLP-1 and PYY.

Leptin is a peptide hormone released by adipose tissue that triggers satiety and thereby tends to reduce or stop further food intake and the development of obesity. It also plays a role in female reproductive function, lipolysis (e.g., the breakdown of triglycerides into their component free fatty acids and glycerol), the growth of fetuses, inflammation, and angiogenesis (i.e., the formation of new blood vessels from pre-existing blood vessels). While studies have suggested that the SC-FA-induced activation of FFAR3 leads to the secretion of leptin from the white adipose tissue of intact animals and the fat tissue isolated from human tissues, other studies have suggested that FFAR2 rather than FFAR3 is responsible for the SC-FA-induced release of leptin from fat tissue. A systematic review of the published studies on this issue concluded that SC-FA-induced activation of FFAR3 is likely responsible for the SC-FA-induced release of leptin from cultured fat tissue taken from animals. However, the data were insufficient to support a role for FFAR3 in the release of leptin from cultured human fat tissues or the fat tissue of intact animals. The role of FFAR3 stimulation of leptin release in appetite suppression and obesity needs further study.

=== Liver fatty acid storage ===
In a high-fat diet-induced obesity model of fatty liver disease (i.e., excessive buildup of fat in the liver), mice fed a diet that increased intestinal levels of SC-FAs showed reductions in their livers' synthesis of lipids, triglyceride levels, and weights. These reductions did not occur in Ffar3 gene knockout mice but did occur in Ffar2 gene knocked-out mice. These results indicate that the SC-FA-induced activation of FFAR3 suppresses the liver's accumulation of fatty acids that underlies the development of fatty liver disease in this mouse model.

Other studies have found that Ffar3 gene knockout mice showed less weight gain than wild-type mice under standard laboratory conditions, but this difference was lost in mice reared under germ-free conditions (i.e., which causes the mice to have lower intestinal and tissue levels of SC-FAs). These findings indicated that the activation of FFAR3 but not FFAR2 by SC-FAs protects against developing fatty liver disease in mice.

=== Insulin secretion ===
Individuals with type 2 diabetes, which accounts for 90% of all diabetes cases, have decreases in the proliferation, maturation, and activity of their pancreatic islet insulin-secreting beta-cells as well as the potency of insulin's actions. These decreases result in reduced insulin secretion, hyperglycemia, and the many other afflictions associated with this disorder.

Studies in the past have reported that the activation of FFAR3 reduced the insulin secreted by (1) human and mouse beta cells in vivo, (2) cultured human and murine beta cell-containing pancreatic islets, and (3) cultured beta cell lines. These studies showed that acetic acid-induced inhibition of insulin secretion by mouse pancreatic islets did not occur in islets that had both of their Ffar3 and Ffar2 genes knocked out but had no effect on insulin secretion in islets that had only one of the two genes knocked out.

=== Blood pressure ===
An early study showed that the intravenous injection of propionic acid into mice induced a brief (<5 min) hypotensive response as defined by drops in their mean arterial pressures. This response was reduced in mice that had one of their two Ffar3 genes knocked out and absent in mice that had both Ffar3 genes knocked out.

A subsequent study reported that Ffar3 gene knockout mice developed abnormally high pulse pressures (i.e., systolic minus diastolic blood pressures) as well as increased amounts of cardiac collagen and elastin connective tissue and increased cardiac stiffness as evidenced by a reduced rate of heart muscle relaxation measured by pressure-volume loop analysis tau levels.

=== Heart rate and energy expenditure ===
Studies have shown that compared to wild type mice, Ffar3 gene knockout mice have: a) significantly smaller-sized sympathetic nervous system ganglia as judged by measurements of this systems' largest ganglia, the superior cervical ganglion; b) significantly slower heart rates; and c) significantly lower norepinephrine levels in their blood plasma. (Norepinephrine is a neurotransmitter that is released by sympathetic nervous system neurons and among other actions increases heart rate and total body energy expenditure.) Furthermore, the treatment of wild type mice with propionic acid increased their heart rates but did not do so in Ffar3 gene knockout mice. Finally, the offspring of Ffar3-gene knockout mice had slower heart rates (as well as lower body temperatures) than the offspring of wild type mice. These findings indicate that FFAR3 regulates heart rates and energy expenditure in mice. Studies are needed to determine if it does so in humans.

== Bacterial short-chain fatty acids ==
Certain bacteria in the gastrointestinal tract ferment fecal fiber into SC-FAs and excrete them as waste products. The excreted SC-FAs enter the gastrointestinal walls, diffuse into the portal venous system, and ultimately flow into the systemic circulation. During this passage, they can activate the FFAR3 on cells in the intestinal wall as well as throughout the body. This activation may: suppress the appetite for food and thereby reduce overeating and the development of obesity; inhibit the liver's accumulation of fatty acids and thereby the development of fatty liver diseases; decrease blood pressure and thereby the development of hypertension and hypertension-related cardiac diseases; modulate insulin secretion and thereby the development and/or symptoms of type 2 diabetes; reduce heart rate and blood plasma norepinephrine levels and thereby lower total body energy expenditures; and suppress or delay the development of allergic asthma.

The specific types of bacteria in the intestines can be modified to increase the number which make SC-FAs by using foods that stimulate the growth of these bacteria (i.e., prebiotics), preparations of SC-FA-producing bacteria (i.e., probiotics), or both methods (see synbiotics). Individuals with disorders that are associated with low levels of the SC-FA-producing intestinal bacteria may show improvements in their conditions when treated with prebiotics, probiotics, or synbiotics while individuals with disorders associated with high levels of SC-FAs may show improvements in their conditions when treated with methods, e.g., antibiotics, that reduce the intestinal levels of these bacteria. (For information on these treatments see Disorders treated by probiotics and Disorders treated by prebiotics). In addition, drugs are being tested for their ability to act more usefully, potently, and effectively than SC-FAs in stimulating or inhibiting FFAR3 and thereby for treating the disorders that are inhibited or stimulated, respectively, by SC-FAs.

== Activating and inhibiting agents ==
The SC-FAs that activate FFAR3 include proprionic, butyric, acetic, valeric caproic, and formic acids. (Confusingly, butyric acid also activates hydroxycarboxylic acid receptor 2 and β-hydroxybutyric acid has been reported to stimulate or inhibit FFAR3.) FFAR2 is activated by many of these same SC-FAs but differs from FFAR3 in its relative binding affinities for them. In humans, the binding affinity ranking of FFAR3 is: propionic = butyric = valeric > acetic > formic acids (acetic and formic acids have very low binding affinities for, and therefore must be at extremely high levels to activate, FFAR3); FFAR2's relative binding affinity ranking for these SC-FAs is: acetic = propionic > butyric > valeric = formic acids. AR420626 (a derivative of an older compound 1-MCPC) has been reported to be a selective activator of FFAR3 but has also been reported to inhibit the activation of FFAR3. Its actions require further characterizations. AR399519 and CF3-MQC have been reported to inhibit the activation of mouse FFAR3; the actions of these agents also require further characterizations.

== Clinical significance ==
=== Obesity ===
Studies have shown that Ffar3 gene knockout mice fed a high fat diet have significant increases in their food intake and body weights compared to wild-type (i.e., genetically unaltered) mice. These and other studies in animals suggest that the activation of FFAR3 and FFAR2 on L cells by SC-FAs triggers the release of PYY and GLP-1, both of which, among various other activities, inhibit gastric emptying and thereby suppress appetite and the development of obesity. Further studies are needed to determine if FFAR3 plays a similar role in human satiety and obesity.

Semaglutide, also called Wegovy, is a peptide with a modified GLP-1-like structure. It strongly stimulates GLP-1 receptors and thereby suppresses appetite and promotes weight loss in obese individuals.

=== Fatty liver disease ===
Studies in mice have shown that activation of FFAR3 by short-chain fatty acids (SC-FAs) suppresses liver lipid synthesis, reduces triglyceride accumulation, and decreases liver weight in models of diet-induced obesity. Mice lacking the Ffar3 gene fail to exhibit these protective effects, suggesting a critical role for FFAR3 in preventing excessive hepatic fat accumulation. These findings support further research to determine whether FFAR3 functions similarly in humans and whether FFAR3 activators could be developed as potential treatments for human fatty liver diseases, including non-alcoholic fatty liver disease.Koh A, De Vadder F, Kovatcheva-Datchary P, Bäckhed F (June 2016). "From Dietary Fiber to Host Physiology: Short-Chain Fatty Acids as Key Bacterial Metabolites". Cell. 165 (6): 1332–1345. doi:10.1016/j.cell.2016.05.041. PMID 27259147. S2CID 8562345.

=== Diabetes ===
In contrast to previous studies, a recent study of streptozotocin-induced and high-fat diet-induced murine models of diabetes found that the FFAR3-activating drug, AR420626, increased blood plasma insulin levels and stimulated skeletal muscle to take up glucose and thereby improved glucose tolerance test results.

Other recent studies have reported that activated FFAR3 may reduce, increase, or have little effect on insulin secretion depending on 1) the levels of ambient glucose and FFAR3 activators studied, (2) human or animal species studied, (3) age of the animals studied, and (4) variations in the proportions of alpha, beta, and delta cells in the pancreatic islets of humans. The role of FFAR3 in human as well as animal models of insulin secretion and diabetes requires further studies.

=== Hypertension-induced cardiovascular disorders ===
In a model where FFAR2 and FFAR3 were both deleted, these animals had an exaggerated response to hypertension, with higher fibrosis in the kidney; this was explained by a breakdown in the gut epithelial barrier and activation of the immune system via LPS/TLR4 binding.

Studies in humans have found that individuals undergoing hemodialysis using dialysis solutions that contain acetic acid often develop hypotension; the role of FFAR3 in this response, if any, was not investigated. A study of 69 individuals (55.1% women, mean age 59.8 years) found that arterial stiffness was associated with lower levels of FFAR3 and FFAR2 in circulating blood immune cells (particularly regulatory T cells which are known to be protective in murine models of hypertension).

Overall, the mouse studies suggest that FFAR3 contributes to suppressing hypertension and its subsequent effects on the heart in mice and that SC-FA-activated FFAR3 and/or FFAR2 may have vasodilatory actions and thereby suppress the development of hypertension and hypertension-induced arterial stiffness in humans. Further studies in humans are needed to investigate the latter possibilities.

=== Allergic asthma reactions ===
Asthma may be atopic (i.e., symptoms triggered by allergens) or non-atopic (i.e., symptoms triggered by non-allergenic factors such as cold air). The studies reported here relate to allergen-induced asthma. Mice fed a diet that lowers their SC-FAs levels and then given intranasal injections of dust mite extract developed dust mite allergy asthma reactions to the injections. Their respiratory tract airways had increased numbers of eosinophils and goblet cells as well as excessive levels of mucus; their lung tissue levels of interleukin-4, interleukin-5, interleukin-13, and interleukin-17A and serum immunoglobulin E levels were elevated; and their airway resistance response to a bronchial challenge test was high. In contrast, mice fed a diet that increased their SC-FAs levels developed less of these responses to the extract. Furthermore, mice on the SC-FA lowering diet that were given propionic acid also had far less of these responses to the mite extract. And, Ffar3 (but not Ffar2) gene knockout mice on the low SF-FA diet did not show rises in their lung airway eosinophil levels in response to the mite extract (this was the only parameter of asthma reported in the knockout studies). These finding implicate propionic acid and FFAR3 in the suppression of asthma allergic reactions to mite extract in mice.

A second study investigated the effects that an inulin-rich diet (which raises bodily SC-FA levels) feed to rats had on their offsprings' development of asthma. Pregnant rats were feed a normal or inulin-rich diet for 1 week. Their offspring were injected with ovalbumin on days 21 and 29 after birth, 7 days later challenged with aerosolized ovalbumin, and on the next day examined for their responses to the aerosol. Compared to the offspring of mothers on a normal diet, the offspring of mothers on the inulin diet had lower levels of lung inflammatory cells, less histological evidence of allergic lung disease, lower lung tissue levels of immunoglobulin E, interleukin-4, and interleukin-17, and significantly elevated lung levels of FFAR3 (Lung FFAR2 levels were not significantly elevated). These results indicate that a diet promoting the production of SC-FAs in pregnant rats suppresses the development of asthmatic disease in their offspring; this suppression may involve FFAR3. In a similar study, newborn mice were feed breast milk from mothers who had drunk pure water or water containing a SC-FA. After 3 weeks, the newborns were weaned off the mothers' milk, feed plain water, and 3 weeks thereafter sensitized to and challenged by injection of mite extract into their tracheas. Mothers who drank pure water or water laced with acetic or butyric acid and sensitized to the mite extract had asthma signs after challenge with the extract whereas mothers who drank propionic acid-laced water had far less of these signs. Furthermore, Ffar3 gene knockout mothers who drank propionic acid-laced water and then sensitized to the mite extract had asthma signs similar to these in wild type mothers challenged with the extract. The study also found that the offspring of mothers who drank propionic acid-laced water had fewer eosinophils and T helper cells in their airways than the offsprings of mothers who drank pure water, acetic acid-laced water, or butyric acid-laced water. Propionic acid-laced water did not suppress the development of asthma in Ffar3 gene knockout offsprings. These results indicate that ingestion of propionic acid, but not acetic or butyric acid, suppresses the development of allergic asthma in adult as well as newborn rats and does so by a FFAR3-dependent mechanism. The studies also indicate that the milk of pregnant rats who consumed propionic acid-laced but not those who drank pure water reduced the susceptibility of newborn rats to developing allergic asthma by a mechanism dependent on FFAR3 in the mothers as well as the offsprings. These findings support further studies to determine if propionic acid or other FFAR3 activators would be useful for preventing and/or treating asthma in humans.

A study of humans living on European farms or in non-farm rural areas reported that the fecal levels of butyric but not acetic acid in 12 month old children who had not develop asthma by the time they entered the first year of school were significantly higher than these levels in children who did develop asthma by the school entry age. A study conducted in Canada reported that the levels of fecal acetic acid (but not butyric or propionic acid) were lower in 3 month old human infants who were predicted to have asthma by school age (based on a Phylogenetic Investigation of Communities by Reconstruction of Unobserved States prediction algorithm) compared to infants predicted not to do so. Finally, a study conducted in Japan found that the fecal levels of propionic but not acetic or butyric acid trended lower in 1 month old human infants that developed asthma by age 5 than in infants that did not develop asthma. The fecal levels of propionic as well acetic and butyric acid obtained from 1 week-, 1 year, and 5-year-old infants did not show this trend. The different SC-FA implicated in suppressing asthma in these three studies may reflect dietary or other differences between the populations of the three countries. In all events, the studies allow that, based on rodent studies, FFAR3 may mediate these SG-FA actions and, based on human studies, SC-FAs may act to suppress, or at least delay) the onset of, asthma in children. Further studies are needed to determine if FFAR3 is involved in the apparent actions of the cited SC-FAs in the development of asthma in children.

== Ligands ==
Agonists

- AR420626

Antagonists

- β-Hydroxybutyric acid (endogenous)
- AR399519
- CF3-MQC

== See also ==
- Free fatty acid receptor
- Disorders treated by probiotics
- Disorders treated by prebiotics
