= Neurotransmitter =

Chemical substance that enables neurotransmission

Structure of a typical chemical synapse

A neurotransmitter is a signaling molecule secreted by a neuron to affect another cell across a synapse. The cell receiving the signal, or target cell, may be another neuron, but could also be a gland or muscle cell.

Neurotransmitters are released from synaptic vesicles into the synaptic cleft where they are able to interact with neurotransmitter receptors on the target cell. Some neurotransmitters are also stored in large dense core vesicles. The neurotransmitter's effect on the target cell is determined by the receptor it binds to. Many neurotransmitters are synthesized from simple and plentiful precursors such as amino acids, which are readily available and often require a small number of biosynthetic steps for conversion.

Neurotransmitters are essential to the function of complex neural systems. The exact number of unique neurotransmitters in humans is unknown, but more than 100 have been identified. Common neurotransmitters include glutamate, GABA, acetylcholine, glycine, dopamine and norepinephrine.

== Mechanism and cycle ==
=== Synthesis ===
Neurotransmitters are generally synthesized in neurons and are made up of, or derived from, precursor molecules that are found abundantly in the cell. Classes of neurotransmitters include amino acids, monoamines, and peptides. Monoamines are synthesized by altering a single amino acid. For example, the precursor of serotonin is the amino acid tryptophan. Peptide neurotransmitters, or neuropeptides, are protein transmitters which are larger than the classical small-molecule neurotransmitters and are often released together to elicit a modulatory effect. Purine neurotransmitters, like ATP, are derived from nucleic acids. Metabolic products such as nitric oxide and carbon monoxide have also been reported to act like neurotransmitters.

	Examples
Amino acids	glycine, glutamate
Monoamines	serotonin, epinephrine, dopamine
Peptides	substance P, opioids
Purines	ATP, GTP
Other	nitric oxide, carbon monoxide

=== Storage ===
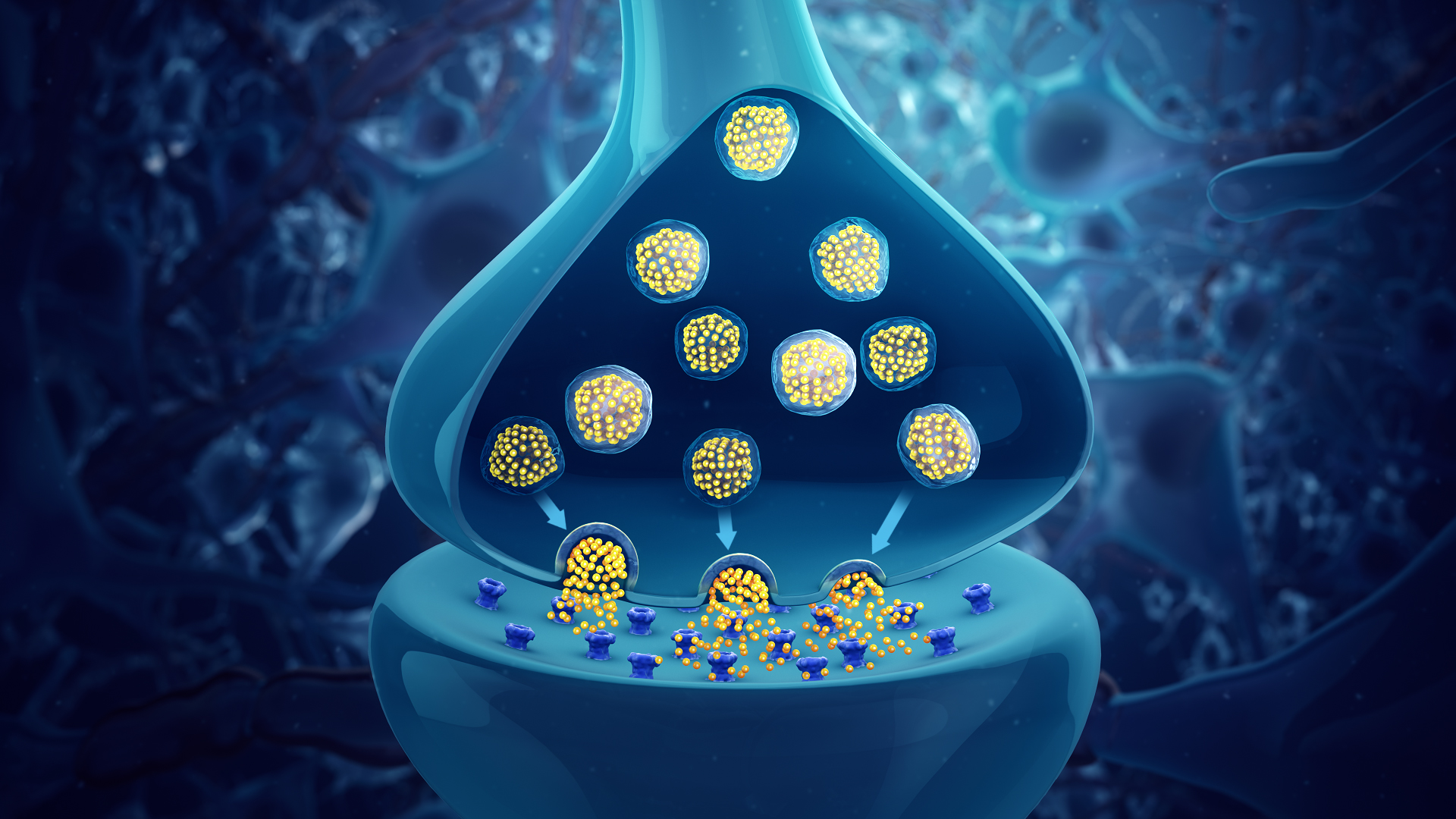
Synaptic vesicles containing neurotransmitters

Neurotransmitters are generally stored in synaptic vesicles, clustered close to the cell membrane at the axon terminal of the presynaptic neuron. However, some neurotransmitters, like the metabolic gases carbon monoxide and nitric oxide, are synthesized and released immediately following an action potential without ever being stored in vesicles.

=== Release ===
Generally, a neurotransmitter is released via exocytosis at the presynaptic terminal in response to an electrical signal called an action potential in the presynaptic neuron. However, low-level "baseline" release also occurs without electrical stimulation. Neurotransmitters are released into and diffuse across the synaptic cleft, where they bind to specific receptors on the membrane of the postsynaptic neuron.

=== Receptor interaction ===
After being released into the synaptic cleft, neurotransmitters diffuse across the synapse where they are able to interact with receptors on the target cell. The effect of the neurotransmitter is dependent on the identity of the target cell's receptors present at the synapse. Depending on the receptor, binding of neurotransmitters may cause excitation, inhibition, or modulation of the postsynaptic neuron.

=== Elimination ===
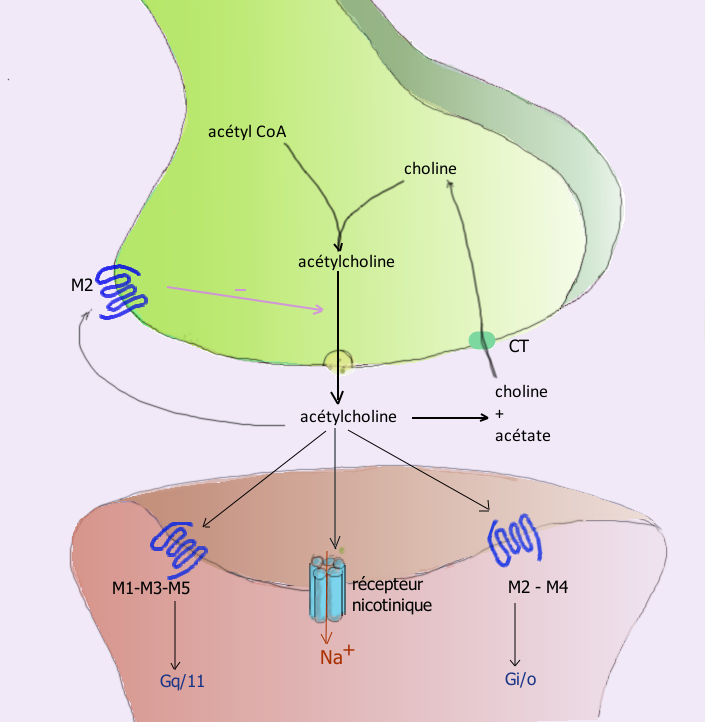
Acetylcholine is cleaved in the synaptic cleft into acetic acid and choline.

In order to avoid continuous activation of receptors on the post-synaptic or target cell, neurotransmitters must be removed from the synaptic cleft. Neurotransmitters are removed through one of three mechanisms:

1. Diffusion – neurotransmitters drift out of the synaptic cleft, where they are absorbed by glial cells. These glial cells, usually astrocytes, absorb the excess neurotransmitters.
  - Astrocytes, a type of glial cell in the brain, actively contribute to synaptic communication through astrocytic diffusion or gliotransmission. Neuronal activity triggers an increase in astrocytic calcium levels, prompting the release of gliotransmitters, such as glutamate, ATP, and D-serine. These gliotransmitters diffuse into the extracellular space, interacting with nearby neurons and influencing synaptic transmission. By regulating extracellular neurotransmitter levels, astrocytes help maintain proper synaptic function. This bidirectional communication between astrocytes and neurons add complexity to brain signaling, with implications for brain function and neurological disorders.
2. Enzyme degradation – proteins called enzymes break the neurotransmitters down.
3. Reuptake – neurotransmitters are reabsorbed into the pre-synaptic neuron. Transporters, or membrane transport proteins, pump neurotransmitters from the synaptic cleft back into axon terminals (the presynaptic neuron) where they are stored for reuse.

For example, acetylcholine is eliminated by having its acetyl group cleaved by the enzyme acetylcholinesterase; the remaining choline is then taken in and recycled by the pre-synaptic neuron to synthesize more acetylcholine. Other neurotransmitters are able to diffuse away from their targeted synaptic junctions and are eliminated from the body via the kidneys, or destroyed in the liver. Each neurotransmitter has very specific degradation pathways at regulatory points, which may be targeted by the body's regulatory system or medication. Cocaine blocks a dopamine transporter responsible for the reuptake of dopamine. Without the transporter, dopamine diffuses much more slowly from the synaptic cleft and continues to activate the dopamine receptors on the target cell.

== Discovery ==
Until the early 20th century, scientists assumed that the majority of synaptic communication in the brain was electrical. However, through histological examinations by Ramón y Cajal, a 20 to 40 nm gap between neurons, known today as the synaptic cleft, was discovered. The presence of such a gap suggested communication via chemical messengers traversing the synaptic cleft, and in 1921 German pharmacologist Otto Loewi confirmed that neurons can communicate by releasing chemicals. Through a series of experiments involving the vagus nerves of frogs, Loewi was able to manually slow the heart rate of frogs by controlling the amount of saline solution present around the vagus nerve. Upon completion of this experiment, Loewi asserted that sympathetic regulation of cardiac function can be mediated through changes in chemical concentrations. Furthermore, Otto Loewi is credited with discovering acetylcholine (ACh) – the first known neurotransmitter.

== Identification ==
To identify neurotransmitters, the following criteria are typically considered:

1. Synthesis: The chemical must be produced within the neuron or be present in it as a precursor molecule.
2. Release and response: When the neuron is activated, the chemical must be released and elicit a response in target cells or neurons.
3. Experimental response: Application of the chemical directly to the target cells should produce the same response observed when the chemical is naturally released from neurons.
4. Removal mechanism: There must be a mechanism in place to remove the neurotransmitter from its site of action once its signaling role is complete.

However, given advances in pharmacology, genetics, and chemical neuroanatomy, the term "neurotransmitter" can be applied to chemicals that:

- Carry messages between neurons via influence on the postsynaptic membrane.
- Have little or no effect on membrane voltage, but have a common carrying function such as changing the structure of the synapse.
- Communicate by sending reverse-direction messages that affect the release or reuptake of transmitters.

The anatomical localization of neurotransmitters is typically determined using immunocytochemical techniques, which identify the location of either the transmitter substances themselves or of the enzymes that are involved in their synthesis. Immunocytochemical techniques have also revealed that many transmitters, particularly the neuropeptides, are co-localized, that is, a neuron may release more than one transmitter from its synaptic terminal. Various techniques and experiments such as staining, stimulating, and collecting can be used to identify neurotransmitters throughout the central nervous system.

== Actions ==
Neurons communicate with each other through synapses, specialized contact points where neurotransmitters transmit signals. When an action potential reaches the presynaptic terminal, voltage-gated calcium channels open, allowing calcium ions to enter the terminal. This calcium influx triggers the fusion of synaptic vesicles with the presynaptic membrane, leading to the release of neurotransmitters into the synaptic cleft. These neurotransmitters then bind to receptors on the postsynaptic membrane, influencing the receiving neuron in either an inhibitory or excitatory manner. If the overall excitatory influences outweigh the inhibitory influences, the receiving neuron may generate its own action potential, continuing the transmission of information to the next neuron in the network. This process allows for the flow of information and the formation of complex neural networks.

=== Modulation ===
A neurotransmitter may have an excitatory, inhibitory or modulatory effect on the target cell. The effect is determined by the receptors the neurotransmitter interacts with at the post-synaptic membrane. Neurotransmitters influence trans-membrane ion flow either to increase (excitatory) or to decrease (inhibitory) the probability that the cell with which it comes in contact will produce an action potential. Synapses containing receptors with excitatory effects are called Type I synapses, while Type II synapses contain receptors with inhibitory effects.

Thus, despite the wide variety of synapses, they all convey only these two types of messages. The two types have different appearances and primarily act on different parts of neurons. Receptors with modulatory effects are spread throughout all synaptic membranes and binding of neurotransmitters sets in motion signaling cascades that help the cell regulate its function. Binding of neurotransmitters to receptors with modulatory effects can have many results. For example, it may increase or decrease in sensitivity to future stimuli by recruiting more or fewer receptors to the synaptic membrane.

Type I (excitatory) synapses are typically located on the shafts or the spines of dendrites, whereas type II (inhibitory) synapses are typically located on the cell body. In addition, Type I synapses have round synaptic vesicles, whereas the vesicles of type II synapses are flattened. The material on the presynaptic and post-synaptic membranes is denser in a Type I synapse than it is in a Type II, and the Type I synaptic cleft is wider. Finally, the active zone on a Type I synapse is larger than that on a Type II synapse.

The different locations of Type I and Type II synapses divide a neuron into two zones: an excitatory dendritic tree and an inhibitory cell body. From an inhibitory perspective, excitation comes in over the dendrites and spreads to the axon hillock to trigger an action potential. If the message is to be stopped, it is best stopped by applying inhibition on the cell body, close to the axon hillock, where the action potential originates. Another way to conceptualize excitatory–inhibitory interaction is to picture excitation overcoming inhibition. If the cell body is normally in an inhibited state, the only way to generate an action potential at the axon hillock is to reduce the cell body's inhibition. In this "open the gates" strategy, the excitatory message is like a racehorse ready to run down the track, but first, the inhibitory starting gate must be removed.

=== Neurotransmitter actions ===
As explained above, the only direct action of a neurotransmitter is to activate a receptor. Therefore, the effects of a neurotransmitter system depend on the connections of the neurons that use the transmitter, and the chemical properties of the receptors.

- Glutamate is used at the great majority of fast excitatory synapses in the brain and spinal cord. It is also used at most synapses that are "modifiable", i.e. capable of increasing or decreasing in strength. Modifiable synapses are thought to be the main memory-storage elements in the brain. Excessive glutamate release can overstimulate the brain and lead to excitotoxicity causing cell death resulting in seizures or strokes. Excitotoxicity has been implicated in certain chronic diseases including ischemic stroke, epilepsy, amyotrophic lateral sclerosis, Alzheimer's disease, Huntington disease, and Parkinson's disease.
- GABA is used at the great majority of fast inhibitory synapses in virtually every part of the brain. Many sedative/tranquilizing drugs act by enhancing the effects of GABA.
- Glycine is the primary inhibitory neurotransmitter in the spinal cord.
- Acetylcholine was the first neurotransmitter discovered in the peripheral and central nervous systems. It activates skeletal muscles in the somatic nervous system and may either excite or inhibit internal organs in the autonomic system. It is the main neurotransmitter at the neuromuscular junction connecting motor nerves to muscles. The paralytic arrow-poison curare acts by blocking transmission at these synapses. Acetylcholine also operates in many regions of the brain as neuromodulatory, but uses different types of receptors, including nicotinic and muscarinic receptors.
- Dopamine has a number of important functions in the brain. This includes critical role in the reward system, motivation and emotional arousal. It also plays an important role in fine motor control; Parkinson's disease has been linked to low levels of dopamine due to the loss of dopaminergic neurons in substantia nigra pars compacta. Schizophrenia, a highly heterogeneous and complicated disorder has been linked to high levels of dopamine.
- Serotonin is a monoamine neurotransmitter. Most of it is produced by the intestine (approximately 90%), and the remainder by central nervous system neurons at the raphe nuclei. It functions to regulate appetite, sleep, memory and learning, temperature, mood, behaviour, muscle contraction, and the functions of the cardiovascular system and endocrine system. It is speculated to have a role in depression, as some depressed patients have been reported to exhibit lower concentrations of metabolites of serotonin in their cerebrospinal fluid and brain tissue.
- Norepinephrine is a member of the catecholamine family of neurotransmitters. It is synthesized from the amino acid tyrosine. In the peripheral nervous system, one of the primary roles of norepinephrine is to stimulate the release of the stress hormone epinephrine (i.e. adrenaline) from the adrenal glands. Norepinephrine is involved in the fight-or-flight response and is also affected in anxiety disorders and depression.
- Epinephrine, a neurotransmitter and hormone is synthesized from tyrosine. It is released from the adrenal glands and also plays a role in the fight-or-flight response. Epinephrine has vasoconstrictive effects, which promote increased heart rate, blood pressure, energy mobilization. Vasoconstriction influences metabolism by promoting the breakdown of glucose released into the bloodstream. Epinephrine also has bronchodilation effects, which is the relaxing of airways.

== Types ==
There are many different ways to classify neurotransmitters. They are commonly classified into amino acids, monoamines and peptides.

Some of the major neurotransmitters are:

- Amino acids: glutamate, aspartate, D-serine, gamma-aminobutyric acid (GABA), (Note: GABA is a non-proteinogenic amino acid) glycine
- Gasotransmitters: nitric oxide (NO), carbon monoxide (CO), hydrogen sulfide (H_{2}S)
- Monoamines:
  - Catecholamines: dopamine (DA), norepinephrine (noradrenaline, NE), epinephrine (adrenaline)
  - Indolamines: serotonin (5-HT, SER), melatonin
  - histamine
- Trace amines: phenethylamine, N-methylphenethylamine, tyramine, 3-iodothyronamine, octopamine, tryptamine, etc.
- Peptides: oxytocin, somatostatin, substance P, cocaine and amphetamine regulated transcript, opioid peptides
- Purines: adenosine triphosphate (ATP), adenosine
- Others: acetylcholine (ACh), anandamide, etc.

In addition, over 100 neuroactive peptides have been found, and new ones are discovered regularly. Many of these are co-released along with a small-molecule transmitter. Nevertheless, in some cases, a peptide is the primary transmitter at a synapse. Beta-endorphin is a relatively well-known example of a peptide neurotransmitter because it engages in highly specific interactions with opioid receptors in the central nervous system.

Single ions (such as synaptically released zinc) are also considered neurotransmitters by some, as well as some gaseous molecules such as nitric oxide (NO), carbon monoxide (CO), and hydrogen sulfide (H_{2}S). The gases are produced in the neural cytoplasm and are immediately diffused through the cell membrane into the extracellular fluid and into nearby cells to stimulate production of second messengers. Soluble gas neurotransmitters are difficult to study because they act rapidly and are immediately broken down, existing for only a few seconds.

The most prevalent transmitter is glutamate, which is excitatory at well over 90% of the synapses in the human brain. The next most prevalent is gamma-Aminobutyric Acid, or GABA, which is inhibitory at more than 90% of the synapses that do not use glutamate. Although other transmitters are used in fewer synapses, they may be very important functionally: the great majority of psychoactive drugs exert their effects by altering the actions of some neurotransmitter systems, often acting through transmitters other than glutamate or GABA. Addictive drugs such as cocaine and amphetamines exert their effects primarily on the dopamine system. The addictive opiate drugs act primarily as functional analogs of opioid peptides, which, in turn, regulate dopamine levels.

=== List of neurotransmitters, peptides, and gaseous signaling molecules ===
Neurotransmitters
Category	Name	Abbreviation	Metabotropic	Ionotropic
Small: Amino acids (Arg)	Arginine	Arg, R	α_{2}-Adrenergic receptors, imidazoline receptors	NMDA receptors
Small: Amino acids	Aspartate	Asp, D	–	NMDA receptors
Small: Amino acids	Glutamate	Glu, E	Metabotropic glutamate receptors	NMDA receptors, kainate receptors, AMPARs
Small: Amino acids	Gamma-aminobutyric acid	GABA	GABA_{B} receptors	GABA_{A} receptors, GABA_{A}-ρ receptors
Small: Amino acids	Glycine	Gly, G	–	NMDA receptors, glycine receptors
Small: Amino acids	D-serine	Ser, S	–	NMDA receptors
Small: Acetylcholine	Acetylcholine	ACh	Muscarinic acetylcholine receptors	Nicotinic acetylcholine receptors
Small: Monoamine (Phe/Tyr)	Dopamine	DA	Dopamine receptors, trace amine-associated receptor 1	–
Small: Monoamine (Phe/Tyr)	Norepinephrine (noradrenaline)	NE, NAd	Adrenergic receptors	–
Small: Monoamine (Phe/Tyr)	Epinephrine (adrenaline)	Epi, Ad	Adrenergic receptors	–
Small: Monoamine (Trp)	Serotonin (5-hydroxytryptamine)	5-HT	Serotonin receptors (all except 5-HT_{3})	5-HT_{3}
Small: Monoamine (His)	Histamine	H	Histamine receptors	–
Small: Trace amine (Phe)	Phenethylamine	PEA	Trace amine-associated receptors TAAR1, TAAR2	–
Small: Trace amine (Phe)	N-methylphenethylamine	NMPEA	TAAR1	–
Small: Trace amine (Phe/Tyr)	Tyramine	TYR	TAAR1, TAAR2	–
Small: Trace amine (Phe/Tyr)	Octopamine	Oct	TAAR1	–
Small: Trace amine (Phe/Tyr)	Synephrine	Syn	TAAR1	–
Small: Trace amine (Trp)	Tryptamine		TAAR1, various serotonin receptors	–
Small: Trace amine (Trp)	N-methyltryptamine	NMT	TAAR1, various serotonin receptors	–
Lipid	Anandamide	AEA	Cannabinoid receptors	–
Lipid	2-Arachidonoylglycerol	2-AG	Cannabinoid receptors	–
Lipid	2-Arachidonyl glyceryl ether	2-AGE	Cannabinoid receptors	–
Lipid	N-Arachidonoyl dopamine	NADA	Cannabinoid receptors	TRPV1
Lipid	Virodhamine		Cannabinoid receptors	–
Small: Purine	Adenosine	Ado	Adenosine receptors	–
Small: Purine	Adenosine triphosphate	ATP	P2Y receptors	P2X receptors
Small: Purine	Nicotinamide adenine dinucleotide	β-NAD	P2Y receptors	P2X receptors

Neuropeptides
Category	Name	Abbreviation	Metabotropic	Ionotropic
Bombesin-like peptides	Bombesin		BBR1-2-3	–
Bombesin-like peptide	Gastrin releasing peptide	GRP	–	–
Bombesin-like peptide	Neuromedin B	NMB	Neuromedin B receptor	–
Bradykinins	Bradykinin		B1, B2	–
Calcitonin/CGRP family	Calcitonin		Calcitonin receptor	–
Calcitonin/CGRP family	Calcitonin gene-related peptide	CGRP	CALCRL	–
Corticotropin-releasing factors	Corticotropin-releasing hormone	CRH	CRHR1	–
Corticotropin-releasing factors	Urocortin		CRHR1	–
Galanins	Galanin		GALR1, GALR2, GALR3	–
Galanins	Galanin-like peptide		GALR1, GALR2, GALR3	–
Gastrins	Gastrin		Cholecystokinin B receptor	–
Gastrins	Cholecystokinin	CCK	Cholecystokinin receptors	–
Granins	Chromogranin A	ChgA	–	–
Melanocortins	Adrenocorticotropic hormone	ACTH	ACTH receptor	–
Melanocortins	Proopiomelanocortin	POMC	Melanocortin 4 receptor	–
Melanocortins	Melanocyte-stimulating hormones	MSH	Melanocortin receptors	–
Neurohypophyseals	Vasopressin	AVP	Vasopressin receptors	–
Neurohypophyseals	Oxytocin	OT	Oxytocin receptor	–
Neurohypophyseals	Neurophysin I		–	–
Neurohypophyseals	Neurophysin II		–	–
Neurohypophyseals	Copeptin		–	–
Neuromedins	Neuromedin U	NmU	NmUR1, NmUR2	–
Neuropeptide B/W	Neuropeptide B	NPB	NPBW1, NPBW2	–
Neuropeptide B/W	Neuropeptide S	NPS	Neuropeptide S receptors	–
Neuropeptide Y	Neuropeptide Y	NY	Neuropeptide Y receptors	–
Neuropeptide Y	Pancreatic polypeptide	PP	–	–
Neuropeptide Y	Peptide YY	PYY	–	–
Opioids	Enkephalins		δ-Opioid receptor	–
Opioids	Dynorphins		κ-Opioid receptor	–
Opioids	Neoendorphins		κ-Opioid receptor	–
Opioids	Endorphins		μ-Opioid receptors	–
Opioids	Endomorphins		μ-Opioid receptors	–
Opioids	Morphine		μ-Opioid receptors	–
Opioids	Nociceptin/orphanin FQ	N/OFQ	Nociceptin receptors	–
Orexins	Orexin A	OX-A	Orexin receptors	–
Orexins	Orexin B	OX-B	Orexin receptors	–
Parathyroid hormone family	Parathyroid hormone-related protein	PTHrP	–	–
RFamides	Kisspeptin	KiSS	GPR54	–
RFamides	Neuropeptide FF	NPFF	NPFF1, NPFF2	–
RFamides	Prolactin-releasing peptide	PrRP	PrRPR	–
RFamides	Pyroglutamylated RFamide peptide	QRFP	GPR103	–
Secretins	Secretin		Secretin receptor	–
Secretins	Motilin		Motilin receptor	–
Secretins	Glucagon		Glucagon receptor	–
Secretins	Glucagon-like peptide-1	GLP-1	Glucagon-like peptide 1 receptor	–
Secretins	Glucagon-like peptide-2	GLP-2	Glucagon-like peptide 2 receptor	–
Secretins	Vasoactive intestinal peptide	VIP	Vasoactive intestinal peptide receptors	–
Secretins	Growth hormone–releasing hormone	GHRH	Growth hormone–releasing hormone receptor	–
Secretins	Pituitary adenylate cyclase-activating peptide	PACAP	ADCYAP1R1	–
Somatostatins	Somatostatin		Somatostatin receptors	–
Tachykinins	Neurokinin A		–	–
Tachykinins	Neurokinin B		–	–
Tachykinins	Substance P		–	–
Tachykinins	Neuropeptide K		–	–
Other	Agouti-related peptide	AgRP	Melanocortin receptor –	
Other	N-Acetylaspartylglutamate	NAAG	Metabotropic glutamate receptor 3 (mGluR3)	–
Other	Cocaine- and amphetamine-regulated transcript	CART	Unknown G_{i}/G_{o}-coupled receptor	–
Other	Gonadotropin-releasing hormone	GnRH	GnRHR	–
Other	Thyrotropin-releasing hormone	TRH	TRHR	–
Other	Melanin-concentrating hormone	MCH	MCHR 1,2	–

Gasotransmitters
Category	Name	Abbreviation	Metabotropic	Ionotropic
Gaseous signaling molecule	Nitric oxide	NO	Soluble guanylyl cyclase	–
Gaseous signaling molecule	Carbon monoxide	CO	–	Heme bound to potassium channels
Gaseous signaling molecule	Hydrogen sulfide	H2S	–	–

== Neurotransmitter systems ==
Neurons expressing certain types of neurotransmitters sometimes form distinct systems, where activation of the system affects large volumes of the brain, called volume transmission. Major neurotransmitter systems include the noradrenaline (norepinephrine) system, the dopamine system, the serotonin system, and the cholinergic system, among others. Trace amines have a modulatory effect on neurotransmission in monoamine pathways (i.e., dopamine, norepinephrine, and serotonin pathways) throughout the brain via signaling through trace amine-associated receptor 1. A brief comparison of these systems follows:

Neurotransmitter systems in the brain
System	Pathway origin and projections	Regulated cognitive processes and behaviors
Noradrenaline system	Noradrenergic pathways: Locus coeruleus (LC) projections; LC → Amygdala and Hippocampus; LC → Brain stem and Spinal cord; LC → Cerebellum; LC → Cerebral cortex; LC → Hypothalamus; LC → Tectum; LC → Thalamus; LC → Ventral tegmental area; Lateral tegmental field (LTF) projections; LTF → Brain stem and Spinal cord; LTF → Olfactory bulb	anxiety; arousal (wakefulness); circadian rhythm; cognitive control and working memory (co-regulated by dopamine); feeding and energy homeostasis; medullary control of respiration; negative emotional memory; nociception (perception of pain); reward (minor role)
Dopamine system	Dopaminergic pathways: Ventral tegmental area (VTA) projections; VTA → Amygdala; VTA → Cingulate cortex; VTA → Hippocampus; VTA → Ventral striatum (Mesolimbic pathway); VTA → Olfactory bulb; VTA → Prefrontal cortex (Mesocortical pathway); Nigrostriatal pathway; Substantia nigra pars compacta → Dorsal striatum; Tuberoinfundibular pathway; Arcuate nucleus → Median eminence; Hypothalamospinal projection; Hypothalamus → Spinal cord; Incertohypothalamic pathway; Zona incerta → Hypothalamus	arousal (wakefulness); aversion; cognitive control and working memory (co-regulated by norepinephrine); emotion and mood; motivation (motivational salience); motor function and control; positive reinforcement; reward (primary mediator); sexual arousal, orgasm, and refractory period (via neuroendocrine regulation)
Histamine system	Histaminergic pathways: Tuberomammillary nucleus (TMN) projections; TMN → Cerebral cortex; TMN → Hippocampus; TMN → Neostriatum; TMN → Nucleus accumbens; TMN → Amygdala; TMN → Hypothalamus	arousal (wakefulness); feeding and energy homeostasis; learning; memory
Serotonin system	Serotonergic pathways: Caudal nuclei (CN): Raphe magnus, raphe pallidus, and raphe obscurus: Caudal projections; CN → Cerebral cortex; CN → Thalamus; CN → Caudate-putamen and nucleus accumbens; CN → Substantia nigra and ventral tegmental area; CN → Cerebellum; CN → Spinal cord; Rostral nuclei (RN): Nucleus linearis, dorsal raphe, medial raphe, and raphe pontis: Rostral projections; RN → Amygdala; RN → Cingulate cortex; RN → Hippocampus; RN → Hypothalamus; RN → Neocortex; RN → Septum; RN → Thalamus; RN → Ventral tegmental area	arousal (wakefulness); body temperature regulation; emotion and mood, potentially including aggression; feeding and energy homeostasis; reward (minor role); sensory perception
Acetylcholine system	Cholinergic pathways: Forebrain cholinergic nuclei (FCN): Nucleus basalis of Meynert, medial septal nucleus, and diagonal band: Forebrain nuclei projections; FCN → Hippocampus; FCN → Cerebral cortex; FCN → Limbic cortex and sensory cortex; Striatal tonically active cholinergic neurons (TAN): TAN → Medium spiny neuron; Brainstem cholinergic nuclei (BCN): Pedunculopontine nucleus, laterodorsal tegmentum, medial habenula, and parabigeminal nucleus: Brainstem nuclei projections; BCN → Ventral tegmental area; BCN → Thalamus	arousal (wakefulness); emotion and mood; learning; motor function; motivation (motivational salience); short-term memory; reward (minor role)
Adrenaline system	Adrenergic pathways: Rostral ventrolateral medulla (RVLM) projections; RVLM → Spinal cord; RVLM → Brain stem; RVLM → Hypothalamus	medullary control of respiration; sympathetic nervous system; feeding and energy homeostasis; arousal; stress

== Effects ==
=== Drug effects ===
Understanding how drugs affect neurotransmitters constitutes a major area of research in neuroscience. Many neuroscientists believe that these studies can improve understanding of the neural circuits involved in neurological and psychiatric disorders, and may contribute to the development of more effective treatments, as well as strategies for prevention and, potentially, cures.

Drugs can influence behavior by altering neurotransmitter activity in the nervous system. Some drugs affect neurotransmitter synthesis by altering the activity of the enzymes involved in their production. When neurotransmitter synthesis is inhibited, the amount of neurotransmitter available for release decreases, thus reducing neurotransmitter activity. Other drugs act by stimulating or blocking the release of specific neurotransmitters. Some drugs also interfere with neurotransmitter storage by causing synaptic vesicles to leak, thereby reducing the amount of neurotransmitter released into the synapse.

Drugs that prevent a neurotransmitter from binding to its receptor are known as receptor antagonists. For example, antipsychotic drugs such as haloperidol, chlorpromazine, and clozapine act primarily as antagonists at dopamine receptors in the brain. In contrast, receptor agonists bind to receptors and mimic the effects of endogenous neurotransmitters. An example is morphine, an opioid receptor agonist that mimics the actions of endogenous opioid peptides such as β-endorphin to relieve pain.

Other drugs prolong the activity of neurotransmitters after their release by blocking neurotransmitter reuptake or inhibiting enzymes responsible for neurotransmitter degradation. Finally, some drugs interfere with the generation or propagation of action potentials by blocking ion channels involved in neuronal signaling. For example, tetrodotoxin blocks voltage-gated sodium channels, thereby preventing neural conduction in both the central and peripheral nervous systems; as a result, tetrodotoxin is highly toxic and can be lethal.

Drugs targeting the neurotransmitter of major systems affect the whole system, which can explain the complexity of action of some drugs. Cocaine, for example, blocks the re-uptake of dopamine back into the presynaptic neuron, leaving the neurotransmitter molecules in the synaptic gap for an extended period of time. Since the dopamine remains in the synapse longer, the neurotransmitter continues to bind to the receptors on the postsynaptic neuron, eliciting a pleasurable emotional response. Physical addiction to cocaine may result from prolonged exposure to excess dopamine in the synapses, which leads to the downregulation of some post-synaptic receptors. After the effects of the drug wear off, an individual can become depressed due to decreased probability of the neurotransmitter binding to a receptor. Fluoxetine is a selective serotonin re-uptake inhibitor (SSRI), which blocks re-uptake of serotonin by the presynaptic cell, which increases the amount of serotonin present at the synapse and furthermore allows it to remain there longer, providing potential for the effect of naturally released serotonin. AMPT prevents the conversion of tyrosine to L-DOPA, the precursor to dopamine; reserpine prevents dopamine storage within vesicles; and deprenyl inhibits monoamine oxidase (MAO)-B and thus increases dopamine levels.

Drug–neurotransmitter interactions
Drug	Interacts with	Receptor interaction	Type	Effects
Botulinum toxin (Botox)	Acetylcholine	–	Antagonist	Blocks acetylcholine release in PNS Prevents muscle contractions
Black widow spider venom	Acetylcholine	–	Agonist	Promotes acetylcholine release in PNS Stimulates muscle contractions
Neostigmine	Acetylcholine	–	–	Interferes with acetylcholinerase activity Increases effects of ACh at receptors Used to treat myasthenia gravis
Nicotine	Acetylcholine	Nicotinic (skeletal muscle)	Agonist	Increases ACh activity Increases attention Reinforcing effects
d-tubocurarine	Acetylcholine	Nicotinic (skeletal muscle)	Antagonist	Decreases activity at receptor site
Curare	Acetylcholine	Nicotinic (skeletal muscle)	Antagonist	Decreases ACh activity Prevents muscle contractions
Muscarine	Acetylcholine	Muscarinic (heart and smooth muscle)	Agonist	Increases ACh activity Toxic
Atropine	Acetylcholine	Muscarinic (heart and smooth muscle)	Antagonist	Blocks pupil constriction Blocks saliva production
Scopolamine (hyoscine)	Acetylcholine	Muscarinic (heart and smooth muscle)	Antagonist	Treats motion sickness and postoperative nausea and vomiting
AMPT	Dopamine/norepinephrine	–	–	Inactivates tyrosine hydroxylase and inhibits dopamine production
Reserpine	Dopamine	–	–	Prevents storage of dopamine and other monoamines in synaptic vesicles Causes sedation and depression
Apomorphine	Dopamine	D2 receptor (presynaptic autoreceptors/postsynaptic receptors)	Antagonist (low dose) / direct agonist (high dose)	Low dose: blocks autoreceptors High dose: stimulates postsynaptic receptors
Amphetamine	Dopamine/norepinephrine	–	Indirect agonist	Releases dopamine, noradrenaline, and serotonin Blocks reuptake
Methamphetamine	Dopamine/norepinephrine	–	–	Releases dopamine and noradrenaline Blocks reuptake
Methylphenidate	Dopamine	–	–	Blocks reuptake Enhances attention and impulse control in ADHD
Cocaine	Dopamine	–	Indirect agonist	Blocks reuptake into presynapse Blocks voltage-dependent sodium channels Can be used as a topical anesthetic (eye drops)
Deprenyl	Dopamine	–	Agonist	Inhibits MAO-B Prevents destruction of dopamine
Chlorpromazine	Dopamine	D2 Receptors	Antagonist	Blocks D2 receptors Alleviates hallucinations
MPTP	Dopamine	–	–	Results in Parkinson-like symptoms
PCPA	Serotonin (5-HT)	–	Antagonist	Disrupts serotonin synthesis by blocking the activity of tryptophan hydroxylase
Ondansetron	Serotonin (5-HT)	5-HT_{3} receptors	Antagonist	Reduces side effects of chemotherapy and radiation Reduces nausea and vomiting
Buspirone	Serotonin (5-HT)	5-HT_{1A} receptors	Partial agonist	Treats symptoms of anxiety and depression
Fluoxetine	Serotonin (5-HT)	supports 5-HT reuptake	SSRI	Inhibits reuptake of serotonin Treats depression, some anxiety disorders, and OCD Common examples: Prozac and Sarafem
Fenfluramine	Serotonin (5-HT)	–	–	Causes release of serotonin Inhibits reuptake of serotonin Used as an appetite suppressant
Lysergic acid diethylamide	Serotonin (5-HT)	Post-synaptic 5-HT_{2A} receptors	Direct agonist	Produces visual perception distortions Stimulates 5-HT_{2A} receptors in forebrain
Methylenedioxymethamphetamine (MDMA)	Serotonin (5-HT)/norepinephrine-dopamine	–	Potent SNDRA(Serotonin-Norepinephrine-Dopamine Releasing Agent) Along with Mild/Weak SNDRI(Serotonin-Norepinephrine-Dopamine Reuptake inhibitor) effect	Stimulates release of serotonin and norepinephrine and inhibits the reuptake Causes excitatory and hallucinogenic effects
Strychnine	Glycine	–	Antagonist	Causes severe muscle spasms
Diphenhydramine	Histamine			Crosses blood–brain barrier to cause drowsiness
Tetrahydrocannabinol (THC)	Endocannabinoids	Cannabinoid (CB) receptors	Agonist	Produces analgesia and sedation Increases appetite Cognitive effects
Rimonabant	Endocannabinoids	Cannabinoid (CB) receptors	Antagonist	Suppresses appetite Used in smoking cessation
MAFP	Endocannabinoids	–	–	Inhibits FAAH Used in research to increase cannabinoid system activity
AM1172	Endocannabinoids	–	–	Blocks cannabinoid reuptake Used in research to increase cannabinoid system activity
Anandamide (endogenous)	–	Cannabinoid (CB) receptors; 5-HT_{3} receptors	–	Reduce nausea and vomiting
Caffeine	Adenosine	Adenosine receptors	Antagonist	Blocks adenosine receptors Increases wakefulness
PCP	Glutamate	NMDA receptor	Indirect antagonist	Blocks PCP binding site Prevents calcium ions from entering neurons Impairs learning
AP5	Glutamate	NMDA receptor	Antagonist	Blocks glutamate binding site on NMDA receptor Impairs synaptic plasticity and certain forms of learning
Ketamine	Glutamate	NMDA receptor	Antagonist	Used as anesthesia Induces trance-like state, helps with pain relief and sedation
NMDA	Glutamate	NMDA receptor	Agonist	Used in research to study NMDA receptor Ionotropic receptor
AMPA	Glutamate	AMPA receptor	Agonist	Used in research to study AMPA receptor Ionotropic receptor
Allyglycine	GABA	–	–	Inhibits GABA synthesis Causes seizures
Muscimol	GABA	GABA receptor	Agonist	Causes sedation
Bicuculine	GABA	GABA receptor	Antagonist	Causes Seizures
Benzodiazepines	GABA	GABA_{A} receptor	Indirect agonists	Anxiolytic, sedation, memory impairment, muscle relaxation
Barbiturates	GABA	GABA_{A} receptor	Indirect agonists	Sedation, memory impairment, muscle relaxation
Alcohol	GABA	GABA receptor	Indirect agonist	Sedation, memory impairment, muscle relaxation Also affects glutamate, glycine, acetylcholine, serotonin and dopamine.
Picrotoxin	GABA	GABA_{A} receptor	Indirect antagonist	High doses cause seizures
Tiagabine	GABA	–	Antagonist	GABA transporter antagonist Increase availability of GABA Reduces the likelihood of seizures
Moclobemide	Norepinephrine	–	Agonist	Blocks MAO-A to treat depression
Idazoxan	Norepinephrine	alpha-2 adrenergic autoreceptors	Agonist	Blocks alpha-2 autoreceptors Used to study norepinephrine system
Fusaric acid	Norepinephrine	–	–	Inhibits activity of dopamine beta-hydroxylase which blocks the production of norepinephrine Used to study norepinephrine system without affecting dopamine system
Opiates (opium, morphine, heroin, and oxycodone)	Opioids	Opioid receptor	Agonists	Analgesia, sedation, and reinforcing effects
Naloxone	Opioids	–	Antagonist	Reverses opiate intoxication or overdose symptoms (i.e. problems with breathing)

==== Agonists ====
An agonist is a chemical capable of binding to a receptor, such as a neurotransmitter receptor, and initiating the same reaction typically produced by the binding of the endogenous substance. An agonist of a neurotransmitter will thus initiate the same receptor response as the transmitter. In neurons, an agonist drug may activate neurotransmitter receptors either directly or indirectly. Direct-binding agonists can be further characterized as full agonists, partial agonists, inverse agonists.

Direct agonists act similar to a neurotransmitter by binding directly to its associated receptor site(s), which may be located on the presynaptic neuron or postsynaptic neuron, or both. Typically, neurotransmitter receptors are located on the postsynaptic neuron, while neurotransmitter autoreceptors are located on the presynaptic neuron, as is the case for monoamine neurotransmitters; in some cases, a neurotransmitter utilizes retrograde neurotransmission, a type of feedback signaling in neurons where the neurotransmitter is released postsynaptically and binds to target receptors located on the presynaptic neuron. (Note: In the central nervous system, anandamide other endocannabinoids utilize retrograde neurotransmission, since their release is postsynaptic, while their target receptor, cannabinoid receptor 1 (CB1), is presynaptic. The cannabis plant contains Δ^{9}-tetrahydrocannabinol, which is a direct agonist at CB1.) Nicotine, a compound found in tobacco, is a direct agonist of most nicotinic acetylcholine receptors, mainly located in cholinergic neurons. Opiates, such as morphine, heroin, hydrocodone, oxycodone, codeine, and methadone, are μ-opioid receptor agonists; this action mediates their euphoriant and pain relieving properties.

Indirect agonists increase the binding of neurotransmitters at their target receptors by stimulating the release or preventing the reuptake of neurotransmitters. Some indirect agonists trigger neurotransmitter release and prevent neurotransmitter reuptake. Amphetamine, for example, is an indirect agonist of postsynaptic dopamine, norepinephrine, and serotonin receptors in each their respective neurons; it produces both neurotransmitter release into the presynaptic neuron and subsequently the synaptic cleft and prevents their reuptake from the synaptic cleft by activating TAAR1, a presynaptic G protein-coupled receptor, and binding to a site on VMAT2, a type of monoamine transporter located on synaptic vesicles within monoamine neurons.

==== Antagonists ====
An antagonist is a chemical that acts within the body to reduce the physiological activity of another chemical substance (such as an opiate); especially one that opposes the action on the nervous system of a drug or a substance occurring naturally in the body by combining with and blocking its nervous receptor.

There are two main types of antagonist: direct-acting Antagonist and indirect-acting Antagonists:

1. Direct-acting antagonist- which takes up space present on receptors which are otherwise taken up by neurotransmitters themselves. This results in neurotransmitters being blocked from binding to the receptors. An example of one of the most common is called Atropine.
2. Indirect-acting antagonist- drugs that inhibit the release/production of neurotransmitters (e.g., reserpine).

===== Drug antagonists =====
An antagonist is a drug that binds to a receptor without activating it, meaning it has no intrinsic activity. By occupying the receptor, it blocks or reduces the effect of an agonist, such as a drug, hormone, or neurotransmitter, that would normally bind to and activate the receptor. Antagonists are often described as receptor "blockers" and may be classified as competitive or irreversible.

A competitive antagonist competes with an agonist for binding to the receptor. As the concentration of the antagonist increases, agonist binding is progressively inhibited, resulting in a decrease in the physiological response. A high concentration of an antagonist can completely inhibit the response. This inhibition can be reversed by increasing the agonist concentration, since the agonist and antagonist compete for binding to the receptor. Competitive antagonists, therefore, can be characterized as shifting the dose–response relationship for the agonist to the right. In the presence of a competitive antagonist, it takes an increased concentration of the agonist to produce the same response observed in the absence of the antagonist.

An irreversible antagonist binds so strongly to the receptor that it renders the receptor unavailable for binding to the agonist. Irreversible antagonists may even form covalent chemical bonds with the receptor. In either case, if the concentration of the irreversible antagonist is high enough, the number of unbound receptors remaining for agonist binding may be so low that even high concentrations of the agonist do not produce the maximum biological response.

Biosynthetic pathways for catecholamines and trace amines in the human brain
In humans, catecholamines and phenethylaminergic trace amines are derived from the amino acid L-phenylalanine.

== Diseases and disorders ==
The following sections describe how imbalances or dysfunction in specific neurotransmitters—dopamine, serotonin, and glutamate—have been tentatively linked to various mental or neurological disorders.

=== Dopamine ===
For example, problems in producing dopamine (mainly in the substantia nigra) can result in Parkinson's disease, a disorder that affects a person's ability to move as they want to, resulting in stiffness, tremors or shaking, and other symptoms. Some studies suggest that having too little or too much dopamine or problems using dopamine in the thinking and feeling regions of the brain may play a role in disorders like schizophrenia or attention deficit hyperactivity disorder (ADHD). Dopamine is also involved in addiction and drug use, as most recreational drugs cause an influx of dopamine in the brain (especially opioid and methamphetamines) that produces a pleasurable feeling, which is why users constantly crave drugs.

=== Serotonin ===
Similarly, after some research suggested that drugs that block the recycling, or reuptake, of serotonin seemed to help some people diagnosed with depression, it was theorized that people with depression might have lower-than-normal serotonin levels. Though widely popularized, this theory was not borne out in subsequent research. Therefore, selective serotonin reuptake inhibitors (SSRIs) are used to increase the amounts of serotonin in synapses.

=== Glutamate ===
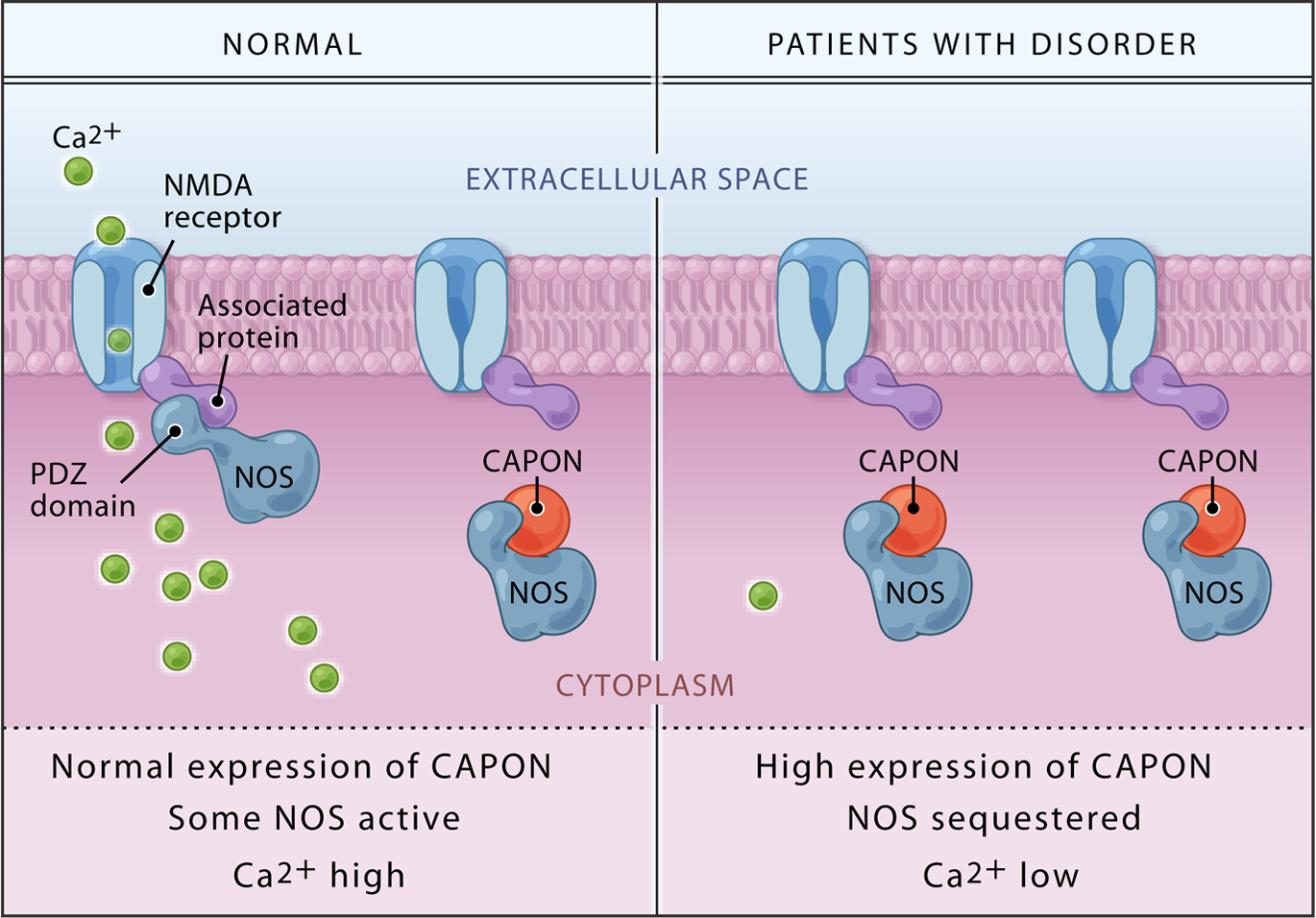
CAPON binds nitric oxide synthase, regulating NMDA receptor–mediated glutamate neurotransmission

Furthermore, problems with producing or using glutamate have been suggestively and tentatively linked to many mental disorders, including autism, obsessive–compulsive disorder (OCD), schizophrenia, and depression. Having too much glutamate has been linked to neurological diseases such as Parkinson's disease, multiple sclerosis, Alzheimer's disease, stroke, and ALS (amyotrophic lateral sclerosis).

== Neurotransmitter imbalance ==
Generally, there are no scientifically established "norms" for appropriate levels or "balances" of different neurotransmitters. In most cases, it is practically impossible to measure neurotransmitter levels in the brain or body at any given moment. Neurotransmitters regulate each other's release, and weak consistent imbalances in this mutual regulation were linked to temperament in healthy people. However, significant imbalances or disruptions in neurotransmitter systems are associated with various diseases and mental disorders, including Parkinson's disease, depression, insomnia, Attention Deficit Hyperactivity Disorder (ADHD), anxiety, memory loss, dramatic weight changes, and addictions. Some of these conditions are also related to neurotransmitter switching, a phenomenon where neurons change the type of neurotransmitters they release. Chronic physical or emotional stress can be a contributor to neurotransmitter system changes. Genetics also plays a role in neurotransmitter activities.

Apart from recreational use, medications that directly and indirectly interact with one or more transmitter or its receptor are commonly prescribed for psychiatric and psychological issues. Notably, drugs interacting with serotonin and norepinephrine are prescribed to patients with problems such as depression and anxiety—though the notion that there is much solid medical evidence to support such interventions has been widely criticized. Studies shown that dopamine imbalance has an influence on multiple sclerosis and other neurological disorders.

There was recently a study done by Traditional Chinese medical College and the First Affiliated Hospital of Hainan Medical University in Haikou, China. They conducted a study to see if acupuncture helps reduce anxiety caused by Neurotransmitter imbalance. They used a total of 70 patients with Generalized Anxiety disorder. These patients were also randomly assigned to a group either the acupuncture group or a waitlist group.The results showed that the acupuncture group showed a statistically significant reduction in HAMA score compared to baseline (p<0.001) unlike the waitlisted group. These study showed that yes acupuncture showed a positive result in using acupuncture to treat anxiety disorder caused by neurotransmitter disorder. Acupuncture across both clinical settings and animal modules acupuncture effectively reduced anxiety symptoms and induced positive charges in the brain regions like the amygdala and hippocampus.

CitationsSun Z, Wang Y, Kang X, Ran B, Wu Q, Huang L, Li J, Kan L, Long H, Liang J, Shen W. Acupuncture Modulates Neurotransmitter-Related Molecules in the Amygdala to Ameliorate Generalized Anxiety Disorder. CNS Neurosci Ther. 2026 Apr;32(4):e70847. doi: 10.1002/cns.70847. PMID: 42007490; PMCID: PMC13093602.

Teleanu, R. I. (2022). Neurotransmitters—Key factors in neurological and neurodegenerative disorders of the central nervous system. International Journal of Molecular Sciences, 23(11), 1–24. https://doi.org/10.3390/ijms23115954

== See also ==
- BK channel § Cellular level
- Kiss-and-run fusion
- Natural neuroactive substance
- Neuroendocrine
- Neuroendocrinology
- Neuropsychopharmacology
- Neurotransmission
- Neurotransmitter analog
- Neurotransmitter release
- Neural pathway
- Neuromodulation
- False neurotransmitter
