= Serotonergic cell groups =

Collections of neurons containing serotonin

Details

Identifiers
- Latin: cellulae serotoninergicae
- NeuroNames: 3137
- FMA: 78546

Serotonergic cell groups refer to collections of neurons in the central nervous system that have been demonstrated by histochemical fluorescence to contain the neurotransmitter serotonin (5-hydroxytryptamine). Since they are for the most part localized to classical brainstem nuclei, particularly the raphe nuclei, they are more often referred to by the names of those nuclei than by the B1-9 nomenclature. These cells appear to be common across most mammals and have two main regions in which they develop; one forms in the mesencephlon and the rostral pons and the other in the medulla oblongata and the caudal pons.

Nine serotonergic cell groups have been identified.

== B1 cell group ==
Cell group B1 occupies the midline nucleus raphes pallidus and adjacent structures in the caudal medulla oblongata of the rodent and the primate.

== B2 cell group ==
Cell group B2 occupies the midline nucleus raphes obscurus and adjacent structures in the caudal medulla oblongata of the rodent and the primate.

== B3 cell group ==
Cell group B3 occupies the midline nucleus raphes magnus and adjacent structures in the caudal medulla oblongata of the rodent and the primate. Its boundary with the serotonergic group B1 is indistinct.

== B4 cell group ==
Cell group B4 is located in the floor of the fourth ventricle, in the vicinity of the vestibular nuclei and abducens nucleus in the rat and in the caudal interstitial nucleus of the medial longitudinal fasciculus of the mouse. A comprehensive study of monoaminergic cell groups in the macaque and the squirrel monkey did not identify a B4 cell group distinct from other groups in the region.

== B5 cell group ==
Cell group B5 is located in the midline pontine raphe nucleus and adjacent areas in the rodent and the primate.

== B6 cell group ==
Cell group B6 is located in the floor of the fourth ventricle dorsal to, and between, the right and left medial longitudinal fasciculus of the pons in the primate and the rodent. and forms the caudal portion of the dorsal raphe nucleus.

== B7 cell group ==
Cell group B7 is a group of cells located in the central gray of the pons, the dorsal raphe nucleus and adjacent structures in the primate and the rodent.

== B8 cell group ==
Cell group B8 is located in the dorsal part of the median raphe nucleus (superior central nucleus) and adjacent structures of the pontine reticular formation of the rodent and the primate.

== B9 cell group ==
Cell group B9 is a group of cells located in the pontine tegmentum, ventral to serotonergic group B8. In the nonhuman primate they are found in the ventral part of the superior central nucleus and adjacent structures. In the rodent they have a more lateral location within the medial lemniscus of the pons and dorsal and medial to it.,
