= Serotonin pathway =

Neurons in the brain that communicate using serotonin

Serotonergic pathways

A serotonin pathway identifies aggregate projections from neurons which synthesize and communicate the monoamine neurotransmitter serotonin. These pathways are relevant to different psychiatric and neurological disorders.

== Pathways ==
Pathway Group	Origin	Projections	Notes
Rostral Group	Caudal linear nucleus (cell group B8)	Stria terminalis	Shares overlap with the dorsal raphe nuclei
Rostral Group	Dorsal raphe nucleus (cell groups B6, B7)	Cerebral cortex; Neostriatum; Amygdala; Substantia Nigra; Pons; Hippocampus; Entorhinal cortex; Locus coeruleus	The anterior dorsal raphe primarily projects to the cortex, neostriatum, amygdala and SN, while the caudal division of the dorsal raphe projects to the latter three. The highest density of cortical innervation is in layer 1.
Rostral Group	Median raphe nucleus (cell groups B5, B8)	Septal nuclei; Ventral tegmental area; Hypothalamus; Midline thalamic Nuclei; Hippocampus; Cerebral cortex	Projections into the hippocampus are the most dense in the subiculum, followed by Ammon's horn and the Dentate gyrus. Projections into the VTA modulate firing rate, increasing the rate with lower activity, and depressing it with higher activity.
Caudal Group	Nucleus raphe magnus (cell group B3)	Dorsal column nuclei; Posterior grey column	
Caudal Group	Nucleus raphe obscurus (cell group B2)	Trigeminal motor nucleus; Retrofacial nucleus; Dorsal nucleus of vagus nerve; Intermediolateral nucleus	All three of the trigeminal motor nuclei receive dense innervations.
Caudal Group	Nucleus raphe pallidus (cell group B1)	Trigeminal motor nucleus; Retrofacial nucleus; Dorsal nucleus of vagus nerve; Intermediolateral nucleus	Some of the serotonergic spinal cord axons may originate in the spinal cord itself.
Caudal Group	Lateral medullary reticular formation	Medulla; Mesencephalon	

== Function ==
Given the wide area that the many serotonergic neurons innervate, these pathways are implicated in many functions, as listed above. The caudal serotonergic nuclei heavily innervate the spinal cord, medulla and cerebellum. In general, manipulation of the caudal nuclei(e.g. pharmacological, lesion, receptor knockout) that results in decreased activity decreases movement, while manipulations to increase activity cause an increase in motor activity. Serotonin is also implicated in sensory processing, as sensory stimulation causes an increase in extracellular serotonin in the neocortex. Serotonin pathways are thought to modulate eating, both the amount as well as the motor processes associated with eating. The serotonergic projections into the hypothalamus are thought to be particularly relevant, and an increase in serotonergic signaling is thought to generally decrease food consumption (evidenced by fenfluramine, however, receptor subtypes might make this more nuanced). Serotonin pathways projecting into the limbic forebrain are also involved in emotional processing, with decreased serotonergic activity resulting in decreased cognition and an emotional bias towards negative stimuli. The function of serotonin in mood is more nuanced, with some evidence pointing towards increased levels leading to depression, fatigue and sickness behavior; and other evidence arguing the opposite.

== See also ==
- Dopaminergic pathways
