= Neuromodulation =

Regulation of neurons by neurotransmitters

Neuromodulation is the physiological process by which a given neuron uses one or more chemicals to regulate diverse populations of neurons. Neuromodulators typically bind to metabotropic, G-protein coupled receptors (GPCRs) to initiate a second messenger signaling cascade that induces a broad, long-lasting signal. This modulation can last for hundreds of milliseconds to several minutes. Some of the effects of neuromodulators include altering intrinsic firing activity, increasing or decreasing voltage-dependent currents, altering synaptic efficacy, increasing bursting activity and reconfiguring synaptic connectivity.

Illustration of the brain and spinal cord connecting to a muscle, illustrating the connection between the central and peripheral nervous system.

Major neuromodulators in the central nervous system include: dopamine, serotonin, acetylcholine, histamine, norepinephrine, nitric oxide, and several neuropeptides. Cannabinoids can also be powerful CNS neuromodulators. Neuromodulators can be packaged into vesicles and released by neurons, secreted as hormones and delivered through the circulatory system. A neuromodulator can be conceptualized as a neurotransmitter that is not reabsorbed by the pre-synaptic neuron or broken down into a metabolite. Some neuromodulators end up spending a significant amount of time in the cerebrospinal fluid (CSF), influencing (or "modulating") the activity of several other neurons in the brain.

== Neuromodulator systems ==
The major neurotransmitter systems are the noradrenaline (norepinephrine) system, the dopamine system, the serotonin system, and the cholinergic system. Drugs targeting the neurotransmitter of such systems affect the whole system, which explains the mode of action of many drugs.

Most other neurotransmitters, on the other hand, e.g. glutamate, GABA and glycine, are used very generally throughout the central nervous system.

Neuromodulator systems
System	Origin	Targets	Effects
Noradrenaline system	Locus coeruleus	Adrenergic receptors in: spinal cord; thalamus; hypothalamus; striatum; neocortex; cingulate gyrus; cingulum; hippocampus; amygdala	arousal (Arousal is a physiological and psychological state of being awake or reactive to stimuli); reward system
Noradrenaline system	Lateral tegmental field	hypothalamus	arousal (Arousal is a physiological and psychological state of being awake or reactive to stimuli); reward system
Dopamine system	Dopamine pathways: mesocortical pathway; mesolimbic pathway; nigrostriatal pathway; tuberoinfundibular pathway	Dopamine receptors at pathway terminations.	motor system; reward system; cognition; endocrine; nausea
Serotonin system	caudal dorsal raphe nucleus	Serotonin receptors in: deep cerebellar nuclei; cerebellar cortex; spinal cordbehavior	behavior; mood; satiety; body temperature; sleep; decrease nociception
Serotonin system	rostral dorsal raphe nucleus	Serotonin receptors in: thalamus; striatum; hypothalamus; nucleus accumbens; neocortex; cingulate gyrus; cingulum; hippocampus; amygdala	behavior; mood; satiety; body temperature; sleep; decrease nociception
Cholinergic system	Pedunculopontine nucleus and dorsolateral tegmental nuclei (pontomesencephalotegmental complex)	(mainly) M1 receptors in: brainstem; deep cerebellar nuclei; pontine nuclei; locus ceruleus; raphe nucleus; lateral reticular nucleus; inferior olive; thalamus; tectum; basal ganglia; basal forebrain	muscle and motor control system; learning; short-term memory; arousal; reward
Cholinergic system	basal optic nucleus of Meynert	(mainly) M1 receptors in: neocortex	muscle and motor control system; learning; short-term memory; arousal; reward
Cholinergic system	medial septal nucleus	(mainly) M1 receptors in: hippocampus; neocortex	muscle and motor control system; learning; short-term memory; arousal; reward

=== Noradrenaline system ===
Skeletal formulae diagram of Noradrenaline

The noradrenaline system consists of around 15,000 neurons, primarily in the locus coeruleus. This is diminutive compared to the more than 100 billion neurons in the brain. As with dopaminergic neurons in the substantia nigra, neurons in the locus coeruleus tend to be melanin-pigmented. Noradrenaline is released from the neurons, and acts on adrenergic receptors. Noradrenaline is often released steadily so that it can prepare the supporting glial cells for calibrated responses. Despite containing a relatively small number of neurons, when activated, the noradrenaline system plays major roles in the brain including involvement in suppression of the neuroinflammatory response, stimulation of neuronal plasticity through LTP, regulation of glutamate uptake by astrocytes and LTD, and consolidation of memory.

=== Dopamine system ===
The dopamine or dopaminergic system consists of several pathways, originating from the ventral tegmentum or substantia nigra as examples. It acts on dopamine receptors.

Skeletal formulae diagram of Dopamine

Parkinson's disease is at least in part related to dropping out of dopaminergic cells in deep-brain nuclei, primarily the melanin-pigmented neurons in the substantia nigra but secondarily the noradrenergic neurons of the locus coeruleus. Treatments potentiating the effect of dopamine precursors have been proposed and effected, with moderate success.

==== Dopamine pharmacology ====
- Cocaine, for example, blocks the reuptake of dopamine, leaving these neurotransmitters in the synaptic gap for longer.
- AMPT prevents the conversion of tyrosine to L-DOPA, the precursor to dopamine; reserpine prevents dopamine storage within vesicles; and deprenyl inhibits monoamine oxidase (MAO)-B and thus increases dopamine levels.

=== Serotonin system ===
Skeletal formulae of Serotonin or 5-HT

The serotonin created by the brain comprises around 10% of total body serotonin. The majority (80-90%) is found in the gastrointestinal (GI) tract. It travels around the brain along the medial forebrain bundle and acts on serotonin receptors. In the peripheral nervous system (such as in the gut wall) serotonin regulates vascular tone.

==== Serotonin pharmacology ====
- Selective serotonin reuptake inhibitors (SSRIs) such as fluoxetine are widely used antidepressants that specifically block the reuptake of serotonin with less effect on other transmitters.
- Tricyclic antidepressants also block reuptake of biogenic amines from the synapse, but may primarily affect serotonin or norepinephrine or both. They typically take four to six weeks to alleviate any symptoms of depression. They are considered to have immediate and long-term effects.
- Monoamine oxidase inhibitors allow reuptake of biogenic amine neurotransmitters from the synapse, but inhibit an enzyme which normally destroys (metabolizes) some of the transmitters after their reuptake. More of the neurotransmitters (especially serotonin, noradrenaline and dopamine) are available for release into synapses. MAOIs take several weeks to alleviate the symptoms of depression.

Although changes in neurochemistry are found immediately after taking these antidepressants, symptoms may not begin to improve until several weeks after administration. Increased transmitter levels in the synapse alone does not relieve the depression or anxiety.

=== Cholinergic system ===
The cholinergic system consists of projection neurons from the pedunculopontine nucleus, laterodorsal tegmental nucleus, and basal forebrain and interneurons from the striatum and nucleus accumbens. It is not yet clear whether acetylcholine as a neuromodulator acts through volume transmission or classical synaptic transmission, as there is evidence to support both theories. Acetylcholine binds to both metabotropic muscarinic receptors (mAChR) and the ionotropic nicotinic receptors (nAChR). The cholinergic system has been found to be involved in responding to cues related to the reward pathway, enhancing signal detection and sensory attention, regulating homeostasis, mediating the stress response, and encoding the formation of memories.

=== GABA ===
GABA nomenclature example

Gamma-aminobutyric acid (GABA) has an inhibitory effect on brain and spinal cord activity. GABA is an amino acid that is the primary inhibitory neurotransmitter for the central nervous system (CNS). It reduces neuronal excitability by inhibiting nerve transmission. GABA has a multitude of different functions during development and influences the migration, proliferation, and proper morphological development of neurons. It also influences the timing of critical periods and potentially primes the earliest neuronal networks. There are two main types of GABA receptors: GABAa and GABAb. GABAa receptors inhibit neurotransmitter release and/or neuronal excitability and are a ligand-gated chloride channel. GABAb receptors are slower to react due to a GCPR that acts to inhibit neurons. GABA can be the culprit for many disorders ranging from schizophrenia to major depressive disorder because of its inhibitory characteristics being dampened.

=== Neuropeptides ===
Neuropeptides are small proteins used for communication in the nervous system. Neuropeptides represent the most diverse class of signaling molecules, and vary considerably between animals. There are 90 known genes that encode human neuropeptide precursors. In the fruit fly Drosophila there are ~50 known genes encoding precursors, and in the worm C. elegans 120 genes specify more than 250 neuropeptides. Most neuropeptides bind to G-protein coupled receptors, however some neuropeptides directly gate ion channels or act through kinase receptors.

- Opioid peptides – a large family of endogenous neuropeptides that are widely distributed throughout the central and peripheral nervous system. Opiate drugs such as heroin and morphine act at the receptors of these neurotransmitters.
1. Endorphins
2. Enkephalins
3. Dynorphins
- Vasopressin
- Oxytocin
- Gastrin
- Cholecystokinins
- Somatostatin
- Cortistatins
- RF-amides
- Neuropeptide FF
- Neuropeptide Y -
- Pancreatic Polypeptide
- Peptide YY
- Prolactin-releasing peptide
- Calcitonin
- Adrenomedullin
- Natriuretic
- Bombesin-like peptides
- Endothelin
- Glucagon
- Secretin
- Vasoactive Intestinal Peptide
- Growth Hormone Releasing Hormone
- Gastric Inhibitory Peptide
- Corticotropin Releasing Hormone
- Urocortin
- Urotensin
- Substance P
- Neuromedins
- Tensin
- Kinin
- Granin
- Nerve Growth Factor
- Motilin
- Ghrelin
- Galanin
- Neuropeptide B/W
- Neurexophilin
- Insulin
- Relaxin
- Agouti-related protein homolog gene
- Prolactin
- Apelin
- Metastasis-suppressor
- Diazepam-binding inhibitor
- Cerebellins
- Leptin
- Adiponectin
- Visfatin
- Resistin
- Nucleibindin
- Ubiquitin

== Neuromuscular systems ==
Neuromodulators may alter the output of a physiological system by acting on the associated inputs (for instance, central pattern generators). However, modeling work suggests that this alone is insufficient, because the neuromuscular transformation from neural input to muscular output may be tuned for particular ranges of input. Stern et al. (2007) suggest that neuromodulators must act not only on the input system but must change the transformation itself to produce the proper contractions of muscles as output.

== Volume transmission ==
Neurotransmitter systems are systems of neurons in the brain expressing certain types of neurotransmitters, and thus form distinct systems. Activation of the system causes effects in large volumes of the brain, called volume transmission. Volume transmission is the diffusion of neurotransmitters through the brain extracellular fluid released at points that may be remote from the target cells with the resulting activation of extra-synaptic receptors, and with a longer time course than for transmission at a single synapse. Such prolonged transmitter action is called tonic transmission, in contrast to the phasic transmission that occurs rapidly at single synapses.

=== Tonic Transmission ===
There are three main components of tonic transmission: Continued release, sustained release, and baseline regulation. In the context of neuromodulation, continuous release is responsible for releasing neurotransmitters/neuromodulators at a constant low level from glial cells and tonic active neurons. Sustained Influence provides long-term stability to the entire process, and baseline regulation ensures that the neurons are in a continued state of readiness to respond to any signals. Acetylcholine, noradrenaline, dopamine, norepinephrine, and serotonin are some of the main components in tonic transmission to mediate arousal and attention.

=== Phasic Transmission ===
There are three main components of phasic transmission: burst release, transient effects, and stimulus-driven effects. As the name suggests, burst release is in charge of releasing neurotransmitters/neuromodulators in intense, acute bursts. Transient effects create acute momentary adjustments in neural activity. Lastly, as the name suggests, stimulus-driven effects react to sensory input, external stressors, and reward stimuli, which involve dopamine, norepinephrine, and serotonin.

== Types of Neuromodulation Therapies and Treatments ==
The term Neuromodulation is also known in medicine as a targeted artificial modification of neuronal activity through the delivery of chemical agents or electroceutical stimulation to specific neurological parts (see more in the wikiarticle Neuromodulation (medicine)).

Invasive and non-invasive treatment methods form a field of medicine called neurotherapy. There are two main categories for neuromodulation therapy: chemical and electroceutical. The noninvasive electroceutical neurotherapy consists of five techniques:

- Photonics neurostimulation through the image-forming vision pathways and skin irradiation. This technique is known as Light therapy, and also known as Phototherapy or Luxtherapy. It refers to the body's exposure to intensive electrical light at managed wavelengths to treat different diseases: Depression, Chronic pain, Post-traumatic stress disorder, and Insomnia.
- Transcranial laser radiation refers to directional low-power and high-fluence monochromatic or quasimonochromatic light radiation, also known as photobiomodulation (PBM).
- Transcranial electric current and magnetic field stimulations;
- Low-frequency sound stimulations, including vibroacoustic therapy (VAT) and rhythmic auditory stimulation (RAS).
- Acoustic photonic intellectual neurostimulation (APIN). It applies features of natural neurostimulation during pregnancy scaled on specific patients. Three therapeutic agents cause oxygenation of neuronal tissues, release of adenosine-5′-triphosphate proteins, and neuronal plasticity. This method shows significant results in chronic pain management in various conditions.

=== Electrical Neuromodulator Therapies ===
Electrical neuromodulation has three subcategories: deep brain, spinal cord, and transcranial, each aiming to treat specific conditions. Deep brain stimulation involves electrodes being surgically implanted into specific sections of the brain that are commonly responsible for movement and motor control deficiencies and disorders like Parkinson's and tremors. Spinal cord stimulation works by being placed near the spinal cord to send electrical signals through the body to treat various forms of chronic pain like lower back pain and CRPS. This form of neuromodulator treatment is considered one of the more high-risk treatments because of its manipulation near the spinal cord. Transcranial magnetic stimulation is slightly different in that it utilizes a magnetic field to generate electrical currents throughout the brain. This treatment is widely used to remedy various mental health conditions like depression, obsessive-compulsive disorder, and other mood disorders.

Neuromodulation is often used as a treatment mechanism for moderate to severe migraines by way of nerve stimulation. These treatments work by utilizing the basic ascending pathways. There are three main modes. It works by connecting a device to the body that sends electrical pulses directly to the affected site (Transcutaneous Electrical Nerve Stimulation), directly to the brain (invasive electrical Neurotherapy techniques), or by holding a device close to the neck that works to block pain signals modulation from the PNS to the CNS. and sends two of the most notable modes of that treatment, which are electrical and magnetic stimulation. Electrical nerve stimulation and some of the characterizations include transcranial alternating stimulation and transcranial direct current stimulation. The other is magnetic stimulation, which includes single pulse and repetitive transcranial stimulation.

=== Chemical Neuromodular Therapies ===
Chemical neuromodulation mostly consists of collaborating natural and artificial chemical substances to treat various conditions. It uses both invasive and non-invasive modes of treatment, including pumps, injections, and oral medications. This mode of treatment can be used to manage immune responses like inflammation, mood, and motor disorders. Recent research has expanded mechanistic models of transcranial direct current stimulation (tDCS) beyond a strictly neuron-centered framework. Evidence suggests that tDCS influences multiple components of the neurovascular unit, including glial cells such as astrocytes and microglia, blood–brain barrier function, and neurovascular coupling. These interactions may contribute to long-lasting neuroplastic and behavioral effects observed following stimulation, indicating that tDCS outcomes are mediated by coordinated neuronal, glial, and vascular processes rather than direct neuronal polarization alone.

== See also ==
- Three-factor learning
- 5-HT2c receptor agonist
- Natural neuroactive substance
