= Monoaminergic cell groups =

Neuron cell collection

Monoaminergic cell groups refers to collections of neurons in the central nervous system that have been demonstrated by histochemical fluorescence to contain one of the neurotransmitters serotonin, dopamine, norepinephrine or epinephrine. Thus, it represents the combination of catecholaminergic cell groups and serotonergic cell groups.
