= Rostral ventromedial medulla =

Group of neurons in medulla of brain

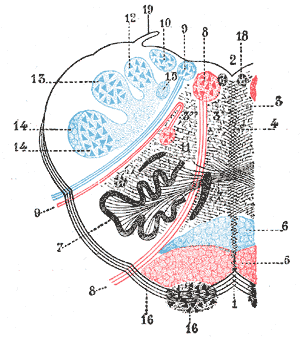
- RVM is labeled 5 in red at the bottom

Details

Identifiers
- Latin: Nucleus ventromedialis
- NeuroNames: 2000

The rostral ventromedial medulla (RVM), or ventromedial nucleus of the spinal cord, is a group of neurons located close to the midline on the floor of the medulla oblongata. The rostral ventromedial medulla sends descending inhibitory and excitatory fibers to the dorsal horn spinal cord neurons. There are 3 categories of neurons in the RVM: on-cells, off-cells, and neutral cells. They are characterized by their response to nociceptive input. Off-cells show a transitory decrease in firing rate right before a nociceptive reflex, and are theorized to be inhibitory. Activation of off-cells, either by morphine or by any other means, results in antinociception. On-cells show a burst of activity immediately preceding nociceptive input, and are theorized to be contributing to the excitatory drive. Neutral cells show no response to nociceptive input.

The rostral ventromedial medulla is also essential in the regulation of arterial pressure.

== Involvement in neuropathic pain ==
Research has shown the RVM to be important in the maintenance of neuropathic pain. Ablation of μ-opioid-expressing neurons in the RVM with a dermorphin-saporin conjugate reduced the duration of allodynia and hyperalgesia caused by a nerve injury. Treatment with the dermorphin-saporin conjugate did not alter baseline pain thresholds, or affect sensitivity in the first 5–10 days after nerve injury. This suggests that the RVM contributes to the persistent pathology caused by nerve injury.

Further research determined that a large majority of μ-opioid-expressing neurons also expressed CCK_{2} receptors. Microinjection in the RVM with either a CCK-saporin or a dermorphin-saporin conjugate eliminated neurons expressing either receptor. Injection of the CCK-saporin conjugate also reversed allodynia and hyperalgesia in a nerve injury model, producing the same results as the dermorphin-saporin conjugate. This destruction of neurons was relatively specific, as less than 10% of neurons in the RVM were destroyed. This suggests that the targeted neurons are the ones responsible for maintaining chronic neuropathic pain states, and that the observed effect was not due to diffuse destruction of RVM neurons.

Research suggests the existence of a "morphine ensemble" in the RVM. The neurons of this "ensemble" include glutamatergic RVM^{BDNF} neurons which project to the spinal cord. These neurons connect to inhibitory neurons, called SC^{Gal} neurons, which release the neurotransmitter GABA and the neuropeptide galanin. The activation of SC^{Gal} neurons is crucial for morphine's pain-relieving effects. Additionally, the neurotrophic factor BDNF, produced within the RVM^{BDNF} neurons, is required for morphine's action. Increasing BDNF levels enhances morphine's analgesic effects, even at lower doses.

In addition, lidocaine microinjections into the RVM temporarily reversed allodynia and hyperalgesia caused by nerve injury.

To help determine whether the persistent pain state was centrally or peripherally mediated, non-noxious stimuli were applied to the nerve-injured limb. In animals receiving vehicle injections into the RVM, there was an increase in c-Fos expression in the superficial and deep dorsal horn of the spinal cord, indicating activation of nociceptive neurons. Animals receiving the dermorphin-saporin conjugate into the RVM had significantly less c-Fos expression. This indicates that a persistent neuropathic pain state is centrally mediated.

== Role of serotonin in pain modulation ==
Serotonin receptors have been hypothesized to play a bidirectional role in the modulation of pain. Based on previous experiments, a 5-HT3 antagonist, ondansetron, and a 5-HT7 antagonist, SB-269,970, were chosen to study.

Systemic or intra-RVM injections of morphine produced dose-dependent antinociception. Spinal administration of SB-269970 reduced morphine-induced antinociception, whereas spinal administration of ondansetron had no effects. SB-269970 and ondansetron were then tested for their efficacy in reducing nociceptive responses. Allodynia and hyperalgesia were experimentally induced by administration of CCK into the RVM. Spinal administration of SB-269970 had no effect on nociception, whereas ondansetron completely reversed the effects of CCK injection. Spinal ondansetron also reversed allodynia and hyperalgesia caused by a peripheral nerve injury. Taken together, these findings indicate a role for 5-HT7 receptors in opioid-induced antinociception, and a role for 5-HT3 in pro-nociceptive facilitation.

One limiting factor is that SB-269970 was also found to be a potent α_{2}-adrenergic antagonist. Since the study using SB-269970 did not use a α_{2}-adrenergic antagonist as a control, it is possible that some of the effects of SB-269970 are from its adrenergic effects.

== Effects of Substance P and Neurokinin 1 receptors ==
The RVM contains high levels of both the neurokinin 1 receptor and its endogenous ligand, Substance P (SP). Microinjections of SP into the RVM resulted in transient antinociception to noxious heat stimuli but not mechanical stimuli. Pretreatment with a neurokinin 1 (NK1) antagonist prevented the antinociception induced by SP injection, but the NK1 antagonist had no effects on pain threshold by itself. To test the effects of an NK1 antagonist during injury states, an NK1 antagonist was microinjected into the RVM after application of Freund's Complete Adjuvant (CFA), a chemical used for inflammation models. Administration of the NK1 antagonist reversed the heat hyperalgesia caused by CFA. In contrast, the administration of an NK1 antagonist further increased the tactile hyperalgesia induced by CFA. However, the NK1 antagonist did prevent some tactile hyperalgesia induced by a different compound, capsaicin. In yet another induced injury model using mustard oil (a TRPA1 agonist), NK1 antagonists did not affect thermal or tactile hyperalgesia.

In contrast to the study above, another group of researchers found that microinjection of SP into the RVM resulted in transient thermal hyperalgesia, which persisted long-term when continuous infusion pumps were implanted. To look more at the SP-NK1 signaling, they performed Western Blots of RVM slices, looking for NK1 receptor expression. NK1 receptor expression was increased from 2 hours to 3 days after administration of CFA.

NK1 agonism induced hypersensitivity is dependent on 5-HT3 receptors, and modulated by GABA_{A} and NMDA receptors as well. Animals were pretreated with spinally administered Y-25130 or ondansetron, both 5-HT3 antagonists, before having RVM injections of SP. Both Y-25130 and ondansetron inhibited SP-induced thermal hyperalgesia. GABA_{A} receptor involvement was demonstrated by intrathecal administration of gabazine, a GABA_{A} antagonist, in animals receiving continuous infusions of SP into the RVM. Gabazine treatment completely reversed the thermal hyperalgesia. The mechanism behind GABA involvement was investigated using in vitro recordings from animals treated with continuous infusions of SP or saline into the RVM. In SP-treated neurons, GABA evoked depolarization, whereas, in saline-treated neurons, it caused hyperpolarization. "These results suggest that descending facilitation induced by RVM SP administration produces GABA_{A} receptor-evoked depolarization and an increase in excitation of dorsal horn neurons." Next, the GABA _{A} agonist muscimol was tested in conjuncture with SP. Intrathecal muscimol significantly enhanced SP-induced hypersensitivity, which was blocked by intrathecal gabazine. Next, the researchers looked at threonine phosphorylation of NKCC1 proteins, which are an isoform of the Na-K-Cl cotransporter. Phosphorylation of these proteins results in increase activity of the cotransporter. Chronic administration of RVM SP or acute SP combined with intrathecal muscimol resulted in significantly higher levels of phosphorylated NKCC1.

== Involvement of NMDA receptors ==
The role of NMDA receptors in non-inflammatory noxious stimuli was examined. The injury model consisted of two injections of acidic saline (pH = 4.0), and was designed to model non-inflammatory muscular pain. Intra-RVM administration of AP5 or MK-801, NMDA receptor antagonists, resulted in a reversal of the mechanical sensitivity induced by the acidic saline.

Behavioral hyperalgesia in inflammatory pain states is closely correlated with phosphorylation of spinal NMDA receptors. To find out more about the role of NMDA receptors in RVM pain facilitation, intrathecal MK-801 was administered before a RVM SP injection. Pretreatment with MK-801 significantly reduced SP induced hyperalgesia. Intrathecal MK-801 also blocked hyperalgesia resulting from continuous SP infusions. SP also increased the phosphorylation of the NR1 subunit of NMDA receptors.

In order to find out the relationship between GABA, NMDA, and SP, MK-801 was administered intrathecally to determine the effect on muscimol potentiation of SP hyperalgesia. MK-801 reduced the exaggeration of SP hyperalgesia induced by muscimol. Also, low doses of SP and intrathecal muscimol increased the expression of phosphorylated NR1 subunits of NMDA receptors. Intrathecal gabazine treatment before muscimol blocked the increase in phosphorylated NR1 expression.

== Purinergic involvement ==
On- and off-cells were both activated by local administration of ATP, a P1 and P2 agonist, whereas neutral cells were inhibited. However, on-cells and off-cells differed in their response to P2X and P2Y agonists.

On-cells displayed a greater response to P2X agonists vs P2Y agonists. For example, α,β-methylene ATP, a P2X agonist, activated all on-cells, whereas 2-methylthio-ATP, a P2Y agonist, activated only 60% of on-cells tested. All on-cells showed a response to the non-specific P2 agonist uridine triphosphate (UTP). Activation of on cells by ATP was reversed by using the P2 antagonists suramin and pyridoxal-phosphate-6-azophenyl-2′,4′disulphonic acid (PPADS), but not with the P2Y antagonist MRS2179.

In contrast, off-cells were more responsive to P2Y agonists. 2-Methylthio-ATP activated all off-cells, whereas α,β-methylene ATP, a P2X agonist, activated only one-third of off-cells. Off-cells were also activated by UTP, but lacked any response to adenosine, a P1 agonist. Activation of off-cells by ATP was inhibited by suramin, PPADS, and MRS2179.

Neutral cells are inhibited by adenosine, a P1 agonist, whereas on-cells and off-cells lack a response to adenosine.

Histological staining by another research group examined the distribution of purinergic receptor subtypes throughout the RVM. P1, P2X1, and P2X3 all showed moderate labeling density, with slightly greater densities observed in the nucleus raphes magnus and the raphe pallidus. In contrast, P2Y1 showed lower levels of labeling. P1 and P2Y1 were shown to be co-localized, as well as P2X1 and P2Y1. Presence of the raphe nuclei in the RVM also led to staining for tryptophan hydroxylase (TPH), a marker for serotonin (5-HT) positive neurons, and looking for co-localization of 5-HT neurons with purinergic receptors. Only about 10% of RVM neurons were TPH positive, but, of those labeled for TPH, a large majority were co-labeled with purinergic antibodies. Fifty-five percent of TPH+ neurons stained for P1, 63% for P2X1, 64% for P2X3, and 70% P2Y1.
