= Nucleus paragigantocellularis =

Neuron cluster of the medulla

The nucleus paragigantocellularis (nPGi) is a part of the brain, located in the rostral ventral medulla. It is a key brainstem region involved in the expression of cardiovascular and respiratory changes that occur following sympathetic activation. The nPGi is one of two major afferents of the locus coeruleus (LC), and sends collateral projections to the LC and to the nucleus of the solitary tract (NTS). Neurons in this region have also been associated with analgesia processes. Consistent with this, PGi neurons have widespread distributions to brain areas that are important for controlling autonomic activity and nociception.
