= Neuromelanin =

Dark pigment found in the brain

5,6-Dihydroxyindole, the monomer out of which neuromelanin polymers are formed

Neuromelanin (NM) is a dark pigment found in the brain which is structurally related to melanin. It is a polymer of 5,6-dihydroxyindole monomers. Neuromelanin is found in large quantities in catecholaminergic cells of the substantia nigra pars compacta and locus coeruleus, giving a dark color to the structures.

== Physical properties and structure ==
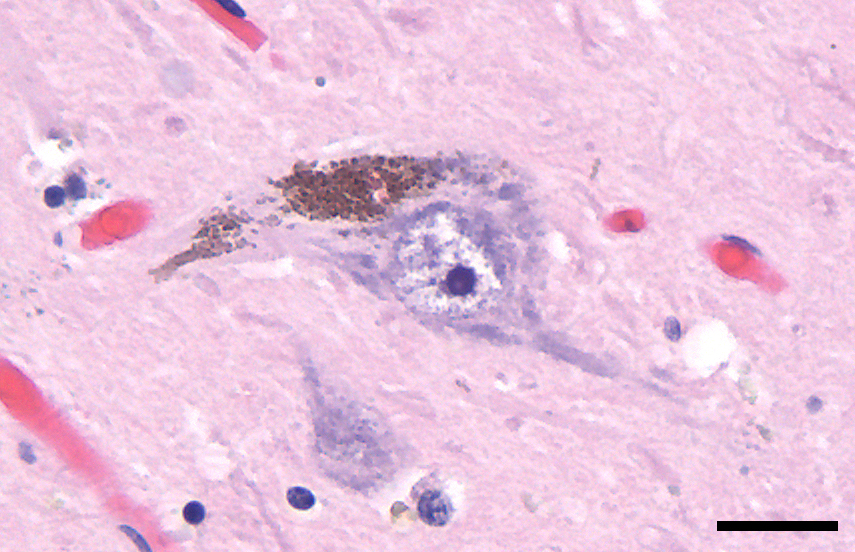
Photomicrograph of neuromelanin (brown material) in a neuron of the substantia nigra. Hematoxylin and eosin stain. The scale bar is 20 microns (0.02mm) in length.

Neuromelanin gives specific brain sections, such as the substantia nigra or the locus coeruleus, distinct color. It is a type of melanin and similar to other forms of peripheral melanin. It is insoluble in organic compounds, and can be labeled by silver staining. It is called neuromelanin because of its function and the color change that appears in tissues containing it. It contains black/brown pigmented granules. Neuromelanin is found to accumulate during aging, noticeably after the first 2–3 years of life. It is believed to protect neurons in the substantia nigra from iron-induced oxidative stress. It is considered a true melanin due to its stable free radical structure and it avidly chelates metals.

== Synthetic pathways ==
Neuromelanin is directly biosynthesized from L-DOPA, precursor to dopamine, by tyrosine hydroxylase (TH) and aromatic acid decarboxylase (AADC). Alternatively, synaptic vesicles and endosomes accumulate cytosolic dopamine (via vesicular monoamine transporter 2 (VMAT2) and transport it to mitochondria where it is metabolized by monoamine oxidase. Excess dopamine and DOPA molecules are oxidized by iron catalysis into dopaquinones and semiquinones which are then phagocytosed and are stored as neuromelanin.

Neuromelanin biosynthesis is driven by excess cytosolic catecholamines not accumulated by synaptic vesicles.

== Function ==
Neuromelanin is found in higher concentrations in humans than in other primates. Neuromelanin concentration increases with age, suggesting a role in neuroprotection (neuromelanin can chelate metals and xenobiotics) or senescence.

== Role in disease ==
Neuromelanin-containing neurons in the substantia nigra degenerate during Parkinson's disease. Motor symptoms of Parkinson's disease are caused by cell death in the substantia nigra, which may be partly due to oxidative stress. This oxidation may be relieved by neuromelanin. Patients with Parkinson's disease had 50% the amount of neuromelanin in the substantia nigra as compared to similar patients of their same age, but without Parkinson's. The death of neuromelanin-containing neurons in the substantia nigra, pars compacta, and locus coeruleus have been linked to Parkinson's disease and also have been visualized in vivo with neuromelanin imaging.

Neuromelanin has been shown to bind neurotoxic and toxic metals that could promote neurodegeneration.

== History ==
Dark pigments in the substantia nigra were first described in 1838 by Purkyně, and the term neuromelanin was proposed in 1957 by Lillie, though it has been thought to serve no function until recently. It is now believed to play a vital role in preventing cell death in certain parts of the brain. It has been linked to Parkinson's disease and because of this possible connection, neuromelanin has been heavily researched in the last decade.
