= Catecholaminergic cell groups =

Collections of neurons in the central nervous system

Catecholaminergic cell groups refers to collections of neurons in the central nervous system that have been demonstrated by histochemical fluorescence to contain one of the neurotransmitters dopamine or norepinephrine. Thus, it represents the combination of dopaminergic cell groups and noradrenergic cell groups. Some authors include in this category 'putative' adrenergic cell groups, collections of neurons that stain for PNMT, the enzyme that converts norepinephrine to epinephrine (adrenaline).

Catecholaminergic cell groups and Parkinson's disease have an interactive relationship. Catecholaminergic neurons containing neuromelanin are more susceptible to Parkinson's related cell death than nonmelanized catecholaminergic neurons. Neuromelanin is an autoxidation byproduct of catecholamines, and it has been suggested that catecholaminergic neurons surrounded by a low density of glutathione peroxidase cells are more susceptible to degeneration in Parkinson's disease than those protected against oxidative stress. Hyperoxidation may be responsible for the selective degeneration of catecholaminergic neurons, specifically in the substantia nigra.
