= QRFP =

Protein-coding gene in the species Homo sapiens

Identifiers
- Aliases: QRFP, 26RFa, P518, pyroglutamylated RFamide peptide
- External IDs: OMIM: 609795; MGI: 3630329; GeneCards: QRFP

Gene location (Human)
Chr.	Chromosome 9 (human)
Band	9q34.12	Start	130,892,707 bp
Band	9q34.12	End	130,896,812 bp

Gene location (Mouse)
Chr.	Chromosome 2 (mouse)
Band	2|2 B	Start	31,696,178 bp
Band	2|2 B	End	31,700,592 bp
RNA expression pattern
Bgee	Human / Mouse (ortholog); Top expressed in: testicle; gonad; mucosa of transverse colon; muscle layer of sigmoid colon; stromal cell of endometrium; popliteal artery; tibial arteries; sural nerve; left coronary artery; Descending thoracic aorta / Top expressed in: embryo; islet of Langerhans; white adipose tissue; spermatocyte; adrenal gland; duodenum; lip; spleen; hypothalamus; uterus; More reference expression data
BioGPS	n/a
Gene ontology
Molecular function	orexigenic neuropeptide QRFP receptor binding; neuropeptide hormone activity
Cellular component	extracellular region; cellular component
Biological process	grooming behavior; positive regulation of blood pressure; neuropeptide signaling pathway; regulation of feeding behavior; locomotory behavior; regulation of signaling receptor activity; G protein-coupled receptor signaling pathway
Sources:Amigo / QuickGO
Orthologs
Databases	NCBI: entry; OMA: entry
Species	Human	Mouse
Entrez	347148	227717
Ensembl	ENSG00000188710	ENSMUSG00000043102
UniProt	P83859	Q8CE23
RefSeq (mRNA)	NM_198180	NM_183424
RefSeq (protein)	NP_937823	NP_906269
Location (UCSC)	Chr 9: 130.89 – 130.9 Mb	Chr 2: 31.7 – 31.7 Mb
PubMed search
- Wikidata
View/Edit Human	View/Edit Mouse

RF(Arg-Phe)amide family 26 amino acid peptide, also known as P518, is a human protein.

The 26-amino acid RF-amide peptide, P518 functions as a high-affinity ligand of GPR103. Both GPR103 and P518 precursor mRNA exhibited highest expression in brain. The 43-amino acid QRFP peptide, a longer form of the P518 peptide is necessary to exhibit full agonistic activity with GPR103. Intravenous administration QRFP caused release of aldosterone, suggesting that QRFP and GPR103 regulate adrenal function.
