= Median raphe nucleus =

Brain region having polygonal, fusiform, piriform neurons

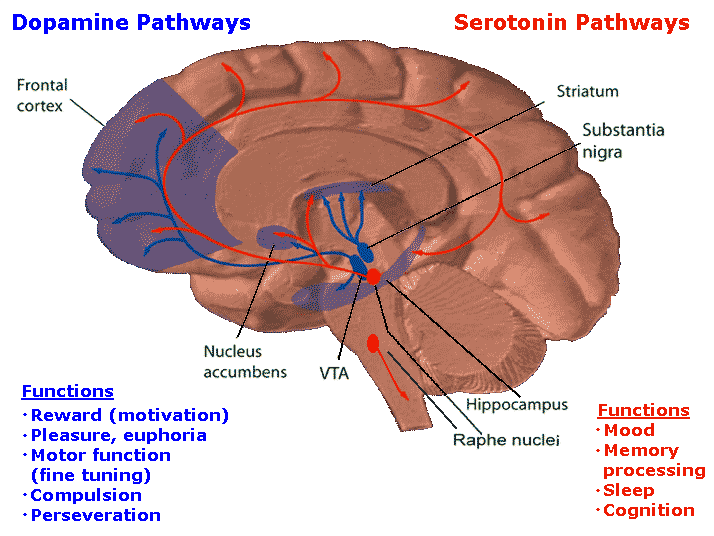
- This image shows the location of the raphe nuclei which includes the median raphe nucleus (seen in the bottom of the image near the brainstem) while also providing information about how it is used in the serotonin pathway which has various cognitive functions.

Details

Identifiers
- Latin: nucleus raphes medianus, nucleus centralis superior
- NeuroNames: 562
- NeuroLex ID: birnlex_889
- TA98: A14.1.05.603
- TA2: 5956
- FMA: 72465

The median raphe nucleus (MRN), also known as the superior central nucleus, is a nucleus in the brainstem composed of polygonal, fusiform, and piriform neurons, which exists rostral to the pontine raphe nucleus. The median raphe nucleus is one of several raphe nuclei that lies on the brainstem midline. It is one of two nuclei that are situated more superior to the others. The second of these nuclei is the dorsal raphe nucleus (DRN). The MRN extends from the lower part of the dorsal raphe nucleus to an approximate position at the decussation of the superior cerebellar peduncle .

The MRN projects extensively to the hippocampus, which is known to be essential for the formation of long-term memory. One study found that this raphe–hippocampus pathway plays a critical role in regulating hippocampal activity and likely associated memory consolidation processes. It has also been found to play a role in anxiety and depression, as one of the few parts of the brain that creates tryptophan hydroxylase.

== Neurophysiology ==
=== Serotonergic neurotransmission ===
The MRN is involved in the serotonin pathway. Serotonin (5-HT) is the chief neurotransmitter of the median raphe nucleus. According to one study, it represents the main source of serotonin (5-hydroxytryptamine (5-HT)) in the brain. Stimulation of the MRN significantly increases the amount of 5-HT present in the brain.

MRN is the main contributor of 5-HT to the dorsal hippocampus as well as anterior and posterior cortical areas. Projections from the MRN extend to forebrain structures. The serotonergic neurons of the MRN give rise to the majority of the ascending 5-HT projections to the forebrain limbic areas that control emotional behavior. Distinct projection areas of the MRN innervates the medial septum, cingulate and dorsal hippocampus. A study found that around 8–12% of cells of the MRN were retrogradely double-labeled after paired injections in the medial septum and various hippocampal subregions including the dorsal CA1 region, dorsal CA3 region, dorsal dentate gyrus and the ventral hippocampus. These cells of the MRN that send collateral projections to the medial septum and hippocampus may serve a unique role in modulation of desynchronization of hippocampus EEG. Also, the MRN has significantly more single- and double-labeled cells after paired injections to the various medial septum and hippocampus regions than in DRN which demonstrate that MRN has more stronger projections to the medial septum and hippocampus than the DRN. MRN fibers are course and large with spherical varicosities. Neurotoxic 5-HT-releasing agents selectively destroy DRN projection fibers without affecting the dense coarse fibers from the MRN. Most of the fibers that distribute to the medial septum terminate selectively within the medial septum-vertical limb of the diagonal band nucleus and lateral aspects of lateral septum. Most of the pronounced projections to hippocampal formation distribute to the stratum lacunosum-molecular of Ammon’s horn and granule cell layer and adjacent inner molecular layer of the dentate gyrus.

=== GABAergic regulation ===
The MRN was also found to be involved in GABAergic inhibitory control of serotonergic neurotransmission: GABA antagonist injections into the rat MRN increased serotonin turnover. Such relationship is also seen when the MRN is electrically stimulated and as a result behavioral inhibition is induced in rats. These behaviors that are typically seen in rats during stressful situations involved crouching, teeth chattering, piloerection, and micturition. When the MRN is electrically stimulated, the behavioral response was not only suppressed but there was a counteraction with para-chlorophenylalanine (PCPA), a serotonin synthesis inhibitor. Such results demonstrate that the MRN is involved in behavioral inhibition as well.

=== Regulation of dopaminergic neurotransmission ===
Projections stemming from the MRN modulate dopaminergic activity within the forebrain. Additionally MnR projections are part of a behavioral disinhibition/inhibition system that produces phenotypes resembling behavioral variations manifested during manic and depressive phases of bipolar disorder.

=== Mood disorders ===
The MRN is one of the few brain regions producing tryptophan hydroxylase, a rate-limiting enzyme of serotonin biosynthesis. Increased levels of tryptophan hydroxylase 2 mRNA (and, consequently, tryptophan hydroxylase) have been noted in suicidal depressed individuals as compared to non-psychiatric controls.

Animal models indicate that inactivation of serotonergic neurons of the median raphe nucleus induces anxiolysis, suggesting involvement of the MRN in anxiety.

=== Hallucinogens ===
Inhibition of the MRN in cats by lysergic acid diethylamide (LSD) and psilocin, two serotonin agonist hallucinogens, leads to dose dependent behavioral changes, indicating the MRN may be an important site of action for humans hallucinations.

=== Memory ===
The MRN projects extensively to the hippocampus, which is known to be essential for the formation of long-term memory. One study found that this raphe–hippocampus pathway plays a critical role in regulation of hippocampal activity and likely associated memory consolidation processes. It has been shown that the MRN is a contributor of serotonergic agents, especially 5-HT to the hippocampus. These findings, together with the demonstration that serotonergic agents block long-term potentiation (LTP) and 5-HT antagonists enhance LTP and/or memory makes it clear that the MRN is involved in formation of long term memory in the hippocampus.

=== Hippocampal theta waves ===
The MRN was found to play a vital role in hippocampal desynchronization; it exerts an inhibitory effect on the mechanism for hippocampal theta wave generation. Also, median raphe nucleus suppresses theta bursts of the medial septal area neurons. Numerous studies reveal that lesions in the MRN continuously caused ongoing theta activity, and when the MRN was injected with pharmacological agents, the neurons displayed inhibited activity or reduced excitatory to drive them to produce theta at short latencies and for long durations. Therefore, MRN is a functional antagonist of the reticular formation which plays a critical role in hippocampal theta generation.
