= Neuromedin =

Neuromedin may refer to:

- Neuromedin B
- Neuromedin N
- Neuromedin S
- Neuromedin U
