= Pyroglutamylated RFamide peptide receptor =

Protein-coding gene in the species Homo sapiens

QRFPR

Identifiers
- Aliases: QRFPR, AQ27, GPR103, SP9155, pyroglutamylated RFamide peptide receptor
- External IDs: OMIM: 606925; MGI: 2677633; GeneCards: QRFPR

Gene location (Human)
Chr.	Chromosome 4 (human)
Band	4q27	Start	121,328,642 bp
Band	4q27	End	121,381,059 bp

Gene location (Mouse)
Chr.	Chromosome 3 (mouse)
Band	3|3 B	Start	36,233,573 bp
Band	3|3 B	End	36,276,462 bp
RNA expression pattern
Bgee	Human / Mouse (ortholog); Top expressed in: gonad; renal cortex; left ventricle; prefrontal cortex; primary visual cortex; hypothalamus; right auricle of heart; apex of heart; superior frontal gyrus; bone marrow cell / Top expressed in: ventromedial nucleus; piriform cortex; embryo; tail of embryo; neural layer of retina; lumbar subsegment of spinal cord; temporal lobe; ventricular zone; olfactory bulb; paraventricular nucleus of hypothalamus; More reference expression data
BioGPS	n/a
Gene ontology
Molecular function	neuropeptide Y receptor activity; peptide binding; G protein-coupled receptor activity; signal transducer activity
Cellular component	integral component of membrane; plasma membrane; integral component of plasma membrane; membrane
Biological process	cellular response to hormone stimulus; neuropeptide signaling pathway; signal transduction; response to peptide; G protein-coupled receptor signaling pathway
Sources:Amigo / QuickGO
Orthologs
Databases	NCBI: entry; OMA: entry
Species	Human	Mouse
Entrez	84109	229214
Ensembl	ENSG00000186867	ENSMUSG00000058400
UniProt	Q96P65	P83861
RefSeq (mRNA)	NM_198179	NM_198192
RefSeq (protein)	NP_937822	NP_937835
Location (UCSC)	Chr 4: 121.33 – 121.38 Mb	Chr 3: 36.23 – 36.28 Mb
PubMed search
- Wikidata
View/Edit Human	View/Edit Mouse

Pyroglutamylated RFamide peptide receptor also known as orexigenic neuropeptide QRFP receptor or G-protein coupled receptor 103 (GPR103) is a protein that in humans is encoded by the QRFPR gene.

== Function ==
G protein-coupled receptors (GPCRs, or GPRs) contain 7 transmembrane domains and transduce extracellular signals through heterotrimeric G proteins.

A 26-amino acid RF-amide peptide, P518 functions as a high-affinity ligand of GPR103. Both GPR103 and P518 precursor mRNA exhibited highest expression in brain. The 43-amino acid QRFP peptide, a longer form of the P518 peptide is necessary to exhibit full agonistic activity with GPR103. Intravenous administration QRFP caused release of aldosterone, suggesting that QRFP and GPR103 regulate adrenal function.
