= Bombesin-like peptides =

Bombesin-like peptide

Identifiers
- Symbol: Bombesin
- Pfam: PF02044
- InterPro: IPR000874
- PROSITE: PDOC00230
Available protein structures:
- PDB: PDB: 1c98 PDB: 1c9a IPR000874 PF02044 (ECOD; PDBsum)
- AlphaFold: IPR000874; PF02044

Bombesin-like peptides comprise a large family of peptides which were initially isolated from amphibian skin, where they stimulate smooth muscle contraction. They were later found to be widely distributed in mammalian neural and endocrine cells.

The amphibian peptides which belong to this family are currently classified into three subfamilies; the Bombesin group, which includes bombesin and alytesin; the Ranatensin group, which includes ranatensins, litorin, and Rohdei litorin; and the Phyllolitorin group, which includes Leu(8)- and Phe(8)-phyllolitorins.

In mammals and birds two categories of bombesin-like peptides are known, gastrin-releasing peptide (GRP), which stimulates the release of gastrin as well as other gastrointestinal hormones, and neuromedin B (NMB), a neuropeptide whose function is not yet clear. Bombesin-like peptides, like many other active peptides, are synthesized as larger protein precursors that are enzymatically converted to their mature forms. The final peptides are eight to fourteen residues long.
