= Nucleus raphe obscurus =

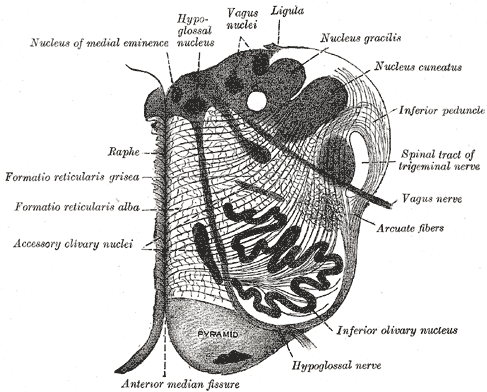
- Section of the medulla oblongata at about the middle of the olive. (Raphe nuclei not labeled, but 'raphe' labeled at left.)

Details

Identifiers
- Latin: nucleus raphes obscurus
- MeSH: D065849
- NeuroNames: 740
- NeuroLex ID: birnlex_1369
- TA98: A14.1.04.319
- TA2: 6037
- FMA: 72585

The nucleus raphe obscurus is one of the medullary raphe nuclei. It is located caudal to the nucleus raphe magnus. The nucleus raphe obscurus projects to the cerebellar lobes VI and VII and to crus II along with the nucleus raphe pontis.

The nucleus raphes obscurus has also been implicated in the modulation of the hypoglossal nerve. It has been observed that the ablation of this nucleus causes a change in the firing pattern of this cranial nerve.

In addition, the nucleus raphe obscurus mediates expiration via the effect of serotonin and depresses periodic synaptic potentials. It has also been shown that this nucleus stimulates gastrointestinal motor function; microinjections of 5-HT into the nucleus raphe obscurus increase gastric movement.

== See also ==
- Raphe nuclei
