= Dorsal raphe nucleus =

Structure of the brainstem

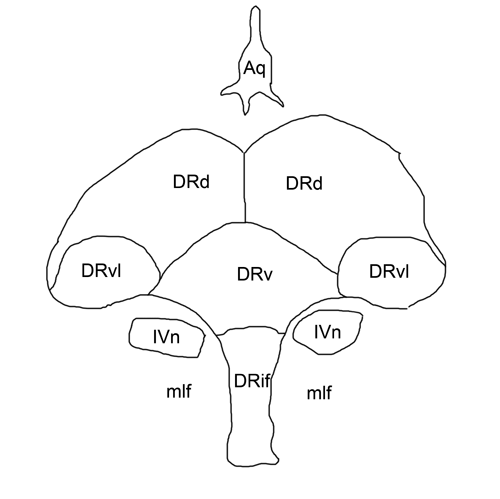
- Outline of the dorsal raphe nucleus: DRif interfascicular subnucleus, DRv ventral subnucleus, DRvl ventrolateral subnucleus, DRd dorsal subnucleus, mlf medial longitudinal fasciculus, Aq cerebral aqueduct, IVn trochlear nucleus.

Details

Identifiers
- Latin: nucleus raphes posterior, nucleus raphes dorsalis
- MeSH: D065847
- NeuroNames: 512
- NeuroLex ID: birnlex_982
- TA98: A14.1.05.604
- TA2: 5957
- FMA: 68462

The dorsal raphe nucleus is one of the raphe nuclei. It is situated in the brainstem at the midline. It has rostral and caudal subdivisions:

- The rostral aspect of the dorsal raphe is further divided into interfascicular, ventral, ventrolateral and dorsal subnuclei.
- The projections of the dorsal raphe have been found to vary topographically, and thus the subnuclei differ in their projections.

== Anatomy ==
=== Efferents ===
The DRN issues serotonergic efferents to the hippocampal formation, limbic lobe, and amygdala (these efferents are involved in regulation of memory processing).

== Neurophysiology ==
=== Serotonergic neurotransmission ===
The dorsal raphe is the largest serotonergic nucleus and provides a substantial proportion of the serotonin innervation to the forebrain.

Serotonergic neurons are found throughout the dorsal raphe nucleus and tend to be larger than other cells. A substantial population of cells synthesizing substance P are found in the rostral aspects, many of these co-express serotonin and substance P. There is also a population of catecholamine synthesizing neurons in the rostral dorsal raphe, and these cells appear to be relatively large.

The dorsal raphe nucleus is rich in pre-synaptic serotonin 5-HT_{1A} autoreceptors, and it's believed that the action of the selective serotonin reuptake inhibitors (SSRIs) in this region is responsible for the latency of their antidepressant effect.

== Research ==
=== Naloxone-induced morphine withdrawal ===
The dorsal raphe nucleus has also been implicated in naloxone-induced morphine withdrawal. It is known that endogenous opioid receptors exist in the dorsal raphe nucleus, and that it is a focal point as an ascending and descending regulator. Pourshanazari et al. showed in their 2000 paper that electrical stimulation of the dorsal raphe nucleus can partially alleviate morphine withdrawal symptoms via electrical stimulation of the raphe nucleus in question.

These are fascinating results; however no control was provided for the spread of electrical charge to other parts of the brain stem. It is quite possible that the charge spread to the nucleus raphes magnus and induced analgesia upon the rats. Knowing that the spread of charge across such a short area is very plausible, as is an alternate connection to the raphe magnus, these results could be called into question.

=== Narcolepsy ===
Wu M.F. et al. studied the dorsal raphe nucleus as it pertained to narcolepsy. This is logical, as the raphe nuclei have been known to play a role in the sleep/wake cycle. Cataplexy is the symptom of narcolepsy when full awareness of the environment is maintained, but all muscle tone is lost. This has thought to be a dissociation of what normally happens during REM sleep, when all muscle tone is lost except for the eyes. The dorsal raphe nucleus has been known to project to the lateral hypothalamus, along with the locus coeruleus and the tuberomammillary nucleus. The neurotransmitters of these three aforementioned nuclei, which project to the lateral hypothalamus, are serotonin, norepinephrine and histamine respectively. These neurotransmitters are fully active during waking hours, partially active during non-REM sleep, and have almost ceased during REM sleep. In cats with pontine lesions, their normal atonia is not present, the dorsal raphe nucleus is fully active, as opposed to the cessation of action under normal conditions. A muscle relaxant, known as Mephenesin, reduces activity of the dorsal nucleus, as well as microinjections of carbachol (which induces atonia while awake).

=== Depression and suicide ===
The rostral raphe nuclei, both the median raphe nucleus and particularly the dorsal raphe nucleus have long been implicated in depression. Some studies have suggested that the dorsal raphe may be decreased in size in people with depression and, paradoxically, an increased cell density in those who die by suicide.

== Other animals ==
An increased number of cells in the lateral aspects of the dorsal raphe is characteristic of primates (including humans).

=== Rat ===
==== Research ====
Ten percent of the axons from the dorsal raphe nucleus of the rat have been shown to project to the amygdala, while only medium cells seem to project to the caudate and putamen and olfactory bulb.

== See also ==
- Raphe nuclei
