= Pontine raphe nucleus =

Nucleus in the brain stem

Details

Identifiers
- Latin: nucleus raphes pontis
- NeuroNames: 589
- NeuroLex ID: birnlex_1110
- TA98: A14.1.05.602
- TA2: 5955
- FMA: 68875

The pontine raphe nucleus is one of the raphe nuclei. It is located in the pontine tegmentum.
