= Raphe nuclei =

Moderate-size cluster of nuclei found in brain stem

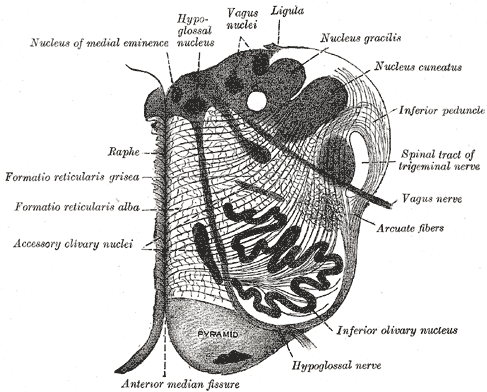
- Section of the medulla oblongata at about the middle of the olive. (Raphe nuclei not labeled, but 'raphe' labeled at left.)

- Horizontal cross section of the brainstem at the lower pons. The raphe nucleus is labeled #18 in the middle.

Details

Identifiers
- Latin: nuclei raphes
- MeSH: D011903
- NeuroLex ID: nlx_anat_20090205
- TA98: A14.1.04.257; A14.1.04.318; A14.1.05.402; A14.1.05.601; A14.1.06.401
- TA2: 6035, 5955
- FMA: 84017

The raphe nuclei (Greek: ῥαφή, "seam") are a moderate-size cluster of nuclei found in the brain stem. They have 5-HT1 receptors which are coupled with Gi/Go-protein-inhibiting adenyl cyclase. They function as autoreceptors in the brain and decrease the release of serotonin. The anxiolytic drug Buspirone acts as partial agonist against these receptors. Selective serotonin reuptake inhibitor (SSRI) antidepressants are believed to act in these nuclei, as well as at their targets.

== Anatomy ==
The raphe nuclei are traditionally considered to be the medial portion of the reticular formation, and appear as a ridge of cells in the center and most medial portion of the brain stem.

In order from caudal to rostral, the raphe nuclei are known as the nucleus raphe obscurus, the nucleus raphe pallidus, the nucleus raphe magnus, the nucleus raphe pontis, the median raphe nucleus, dorsal raphe nucleus, caudal linear nucleus. In the first systematic examination of the raphe nuclei, Taber et al.. (1960) originally proposed the existence of two linear nuclei (nucleus linearis intermedius and nucleus linearis rostralis). This study was published before techniques enabling the visualization of serotonin or the enzymes participating in its synthesis had been developed, as first demonstrated by Dahlström and Fuxe in 1964. Later, it was revealed that of these two nuclei, only the former (nucleus linearis intermedius, now known as the caudal linear nucleus), proved to contain serotonin-producing neurons, though both of them contain dopaminergic neurons.

In some works (e.g.), researchers have grouped the nuclei lineares into one nucleus, the nucleus linearis, shrinking the number of raphe to seven, e.g., NeuroNames makes the following ordering:

- Raphe nuclei of medulla oblongata
  - Nucleus raphe obscurus
  - Nucleus raphe magnus
  - Nucleus raphe pallidus
- Raphe nuclei of the pontine reticular formation
  - Nucleus raphe pontis
  - Nucleus centralis inferior
- Raphe nuclei of the midbrain reticular formation
  - Nucleus centralis superior (median raphe nucleus)
  - Nucleus raphe dorsalis

== Nomenclature ==
The Latin names commonly used for most of these nuclei are grammatically and orthographically incorrect. Latin grammar would require to use the genitive case raphes ('of the seam') instead of the nominative case raphe ('seam') in these Latin expressions. The main authority in anatomical names, Terminologia Anatomica uses for example nucleus raphes magnus instead of the grammatically incorrect nucleus raphe magnus. The spelling raphe/raphes however can also be contested as numerous sources indicate that raphe is an incorrect Latin rendering of the Ancient Greek word ῥαφή as the initial letter rho with rough breathing (spiritus asper) is normally rendered as rh in Latin. The edition of the Nomina Anatomica that was ratified in Jena in 1935 used rhaphe instead of raphe.

== Projections ==
These nuclei interact with almost every pertinent portion of the brain, but only a few of them have specifically independent interaction. These select nuclei are discussed as follows.

Overall, the caudal raphe nuclei, including the nucleus raphe magnus, nucleus raphe pallidus and nucleus raphe obscurus, all project towards the spinal cord and brain stem. The more-rostral nuclei, including the nucleus raphe pontis, nucleus centralis superior (also called median raphe nucleus, mRN) and nucleus raphe dorsalis (dRN) project towards the brain areas of higher function

The numerous projections from the mRN and dRN to key brain structures make serotonergic system fundamental in regulating brain homeostasis. However, studies also show feedback loops from numerous areas of the brain controlling the serotonergic neurons located in the nucleus raphe dorsalis, including the orbital cortex, cingulate cortex, medial preoptic area, lateral preoptic area, and several areas of the hypothalamus. The connection between these areas, particularly between the nucleus raphe dorsalis and the orbital cortices, is thought to have influences on depression and obsessive compulsive disorder prognosis.

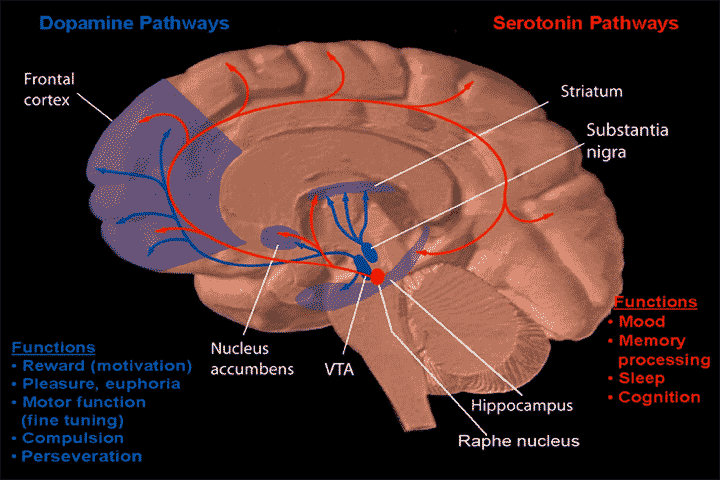
Dopamine and serotonin pathways in the brain

== Function ==
The raphe nuclei have a vast impact upon the central nervous system. Many of the neurons in the nuclei (but not the majority) are serotonergic; i.e., contain serotonin, a type of monoamine neurotransmitter and are modulated through fibrous pathways in the midbrain.

Projections from the raphe nuclei also terminate in the dorsal horn of spinal gray matter where they regulate the release of enkephalins, which inhibit pain sensation.

The raphe nuclei provide feedback to the suprachiasmatic nuclei (SCN), thus contributing in circadian rhythms in animals. The SCN transmits to the raphe nuclei via the dorsomedial hypothalamic nucleus altering serotonin levels for sleep/wake states. The raphe nuclei will then transmit feedback to the SCN about the animal's vigilance and levels of alertness. This reciprocal feedback between the two structures provides an adaptable yet stable basis of circadian rhythms.

=== Thermoregulation ===
A large increase in sympathetic nerve activity was observed when an excitatory amino acid was injected into the raphe pallidus, resulting in both brown adipose tissue (BAT) temperature and heart rate increasing. This suggests that activation of the raphe nucleus results in an increase in sympathetic activity to the BAT.

The raphe pallidus wasn't switched off using 8-OH-DPAT, which in turn reduced body temperature due to a reduced response to cold. This suggests the importance of the raphe nucleus in responding appropriately to the cold.

=== Sleep and arousal regulation ===
According to Michel Jouve from Lyon, there is a contradiction in study findings regarding the relationship between serotonin and sleep: initially, serotonin was believed to act as a neuromodulator of sleep, as destruction of serotonergic neurons in the raphe nuclei or inhibition of serotonin synthesis induced severe insomnia. However, studies showed that the electrical activity of serotonergic cell bodies and serotonin release increases during wakefulness and decreases during sleep, which appears at first glance to contradict the idea of serotonin contributing to sleep. For the same author, serotonin release during wakefulness can trigger a cascade of genomic events in some sleep-promoting neurons in the preoptic area, allowing it under certain conditions to also contribute to increased sleep propensity and regulation of slow-wave sleep, Cespigluou, from the same laboratory, explains that serotonin (5-HT) participates in sleep in two distinct ways. First, when released during wakefulness via axonal nerve endings, it influences the synthesis of sleep-promoting substances in specific brain regions. Second, when released during sleep within the dorsal raphe nucleus by dendrites of serotonergic neurons, it contributes to silencing serotonergic cell bodies through an auto-inhibitory process.

According to Monti from Uruguay, who based his conclusions on electrophysiological, neurochemical, genetic, and neuropharmacological approaches, serotonin (5-HT) originating from the dorsal raphe nucleus primarily promotes wakefulness and inhibits rapid eye movement (REM) sleep, the stage during which dreaming occurs. For Barbara Estone Jones, Serotonergic raphe neurons promote a seemingly quiet or satiated waking state, which though exclusive of REMS, can actually be conducive to SWS

=== The raphe nuclei and the effects of ghrelin ===
More recent studies of the Raphe Nuclei done with rats involve the effects of ghrelin on the dorsal raphe nucleus. When administered, larger doses of ghrelin act centrally on the raphe nucleus, hippocampus, and amygdala which causes dramatic increases in food intake, memory retention, and increases in anxiety. The effects of ghrelin are seen on the raphe nucleus as soon as an hour after injection, suggesting rapid changes in the structure of the nucleus. Changes also occur after 24 hours suggesting delayed modifications as well.

== See also ==
- Locus ceruleus
- Substantia nigra
- Pedunculopontine nucleus
- List of regions in the human brain
