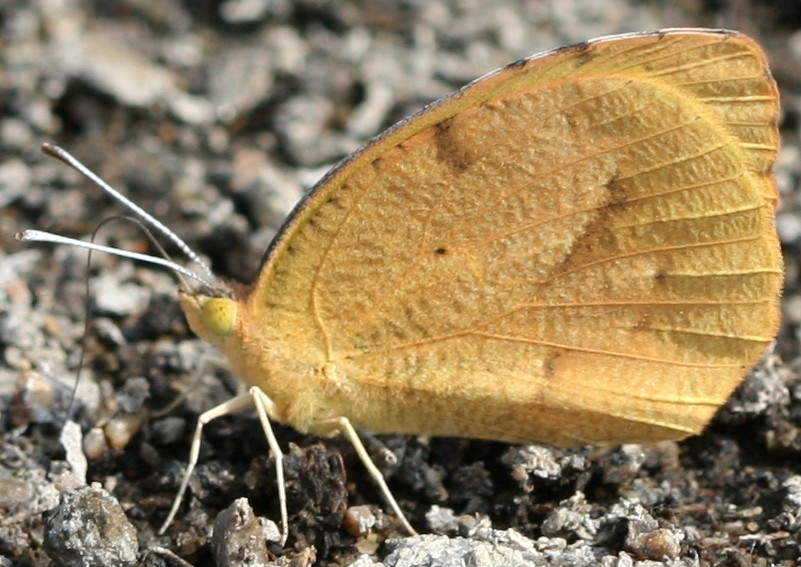

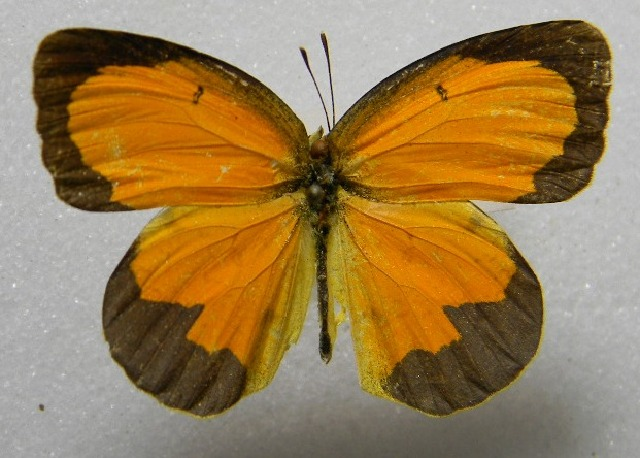

Conservation status
- Least Concern (IUCN 3.1)

- Secure (NatureServe)

Scientific classification
- Kingdom: Animalia
- Phylum: Arthropoda
- Clade: Pancrustacea
- Class: Insecta
- Order: Lepidoptera
- Family: Pieridae
- Genus: Eurema
- Species: E. nicippe

Binomial name
- Eurema nicippe (Cramer, 1779)

Synonyms
- Abaeis nicippe Cramer, 1779

= Eurema nicippe =

Sleepy orange

Species of butterfly

Eurema nicippe, the sleepy orange, is a North American butterfly in the family Pieridae. Its range spans from Central America to north along the United States–Mexico border, and it often travels further to non-mountainous regions of the Southeastern United States.

This species occupies a wide range of habitats in open and disturbed environments such as roadsides, agricultural land, and scrub habitats.

In addition to its broad distribution, E. nicippe displays complex behavioral and ecological interactions such as host plant specialization and oviposition decision making based on both visual and chemical cues.

== Description ==
The sleepy orange is a bright orange butterfly with the upperside of the wings having wide black borders. The forewing costal margin has a small, narrow black marking that resembles a closed eye. Contrary to popular belief, its name originates from this wing patterning, rather than its behavior; the butterfly has a very rapid flight pattern when disturbed. The underside of the wings varies seasonally: summer forms are bright yellow with brick-red markings, while winter forms are browner and more heavily marked. It has a wingspan of 1 3/8–2 1/4 inches (35–50 mm).

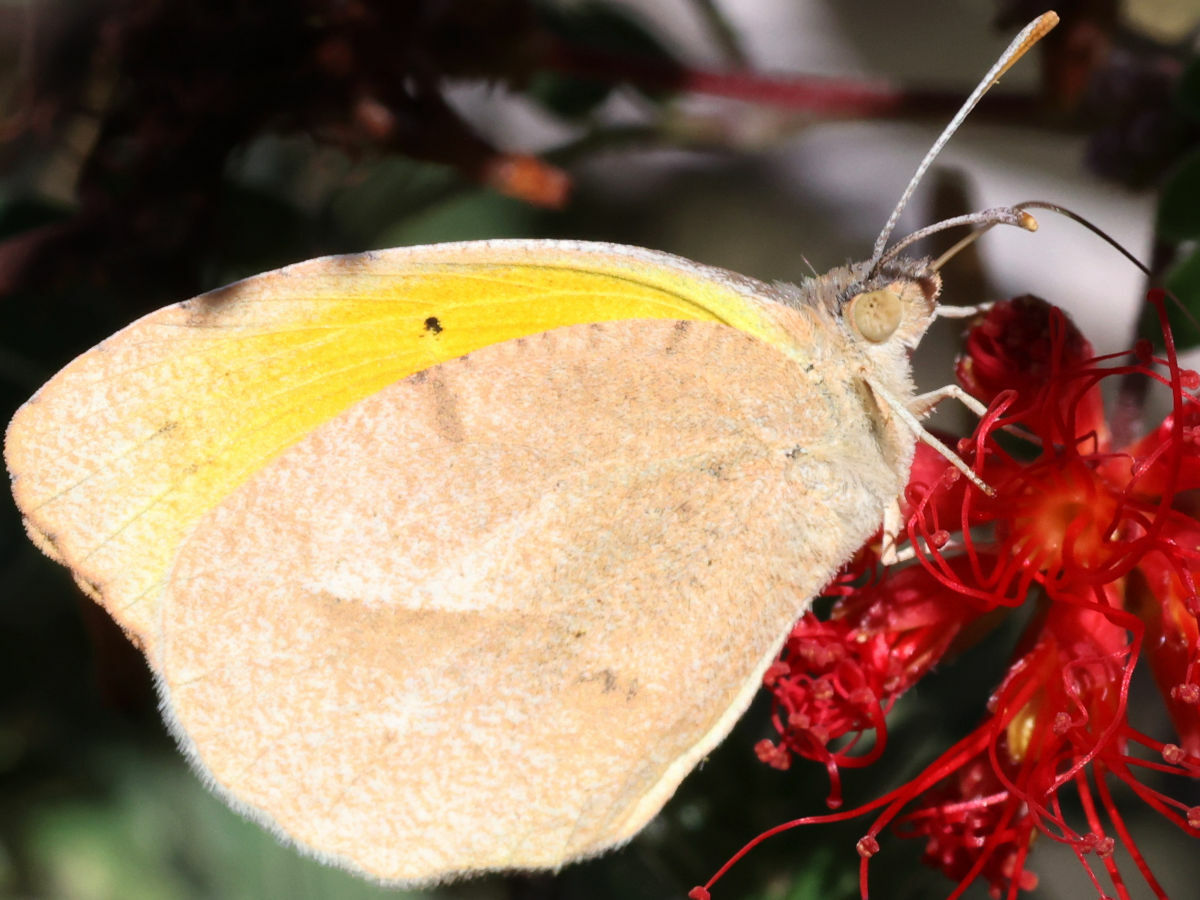
underside (summer form)

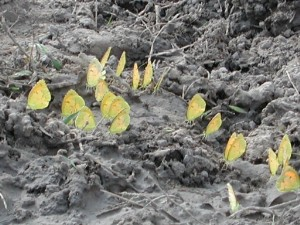
puddling on damp ground

== Habitat ==
The sleepy orange generally prefers low elevation areas, agricultural land, and disturbed sites, and may be found in or around old fields, roadsides, woods edges, swamps, wet meadows, open woodlands, margins of ponds, waterways, and valleys.

== Taxonomy ==
Eurema nicippe was originally described by Pieter Cramer in 1779 and has historically been placed in the Eurema genus. Its broader phylogenetic placement has been clarified by molecular studies of the Pieridae family, with diversification rates across Pieridae correlating with temperature gradients across evolutionary time.

The taxonomic classification of Eurema nicippe has been debated by authorities and placed under the genus Abaeis as Abaeis nicippe. However, the Euremini butterfly tribe contains several traditionally separated genera that are phylogenetically nested within Eurema. To resolve paraphyly, researchers proposed an expanded genus of Eurema and treat Abaeis as a subgenus.

Eurema nicippe shares morphological, ecological, and larval similarities with several closely related species within the Eurema genus driven by host plant preferences for the pea family Fabaceae and characteristic seasonal behavior. Similar species include Pyrisitia proterpia (Tailed Orange) and Pyrisitia lisa (Little Yellow) due to habitat preference and flight behavior. Within Pieridae, Leucidia and Teriocolias are placed as sister genera to Eurema.

== Distribution and range ==
The sleepy orange occupies a broad range spanning Central America northward through Mexico, the southern United States, and occasionally into the northern United States during warmer months. Its permanent resident range is concentrated around Florida and Texas where adults may be found year round. The species regularly travels beyond its permanent range in summer, with records documented as far north as Connecticut.

The sleepy orange has the capacity for long distance dispersal with an established population existing in Hawaii which provides evidence that the species is capable of founding new populations far outside its native range.

The species generally prefers low elevation areas and is not recorded at high altitudes where terrain features such as mountain ranges restrict movement.

== Life cycle ==
Its eggs are spindle-shaped and white in color when first laid, but quickly turn yellow. The larva is pale green with a narrow white stripe along its length on either side and very short hairs. The chrysalis varies from pale green to brown-black later in its life cycle. They have two to four broods per year.

=== Eggs ===
Females will occasionally lay eggs on Phyllanthus tenellus (Euphorbiaceae) which is a plant whose leaf is morphologically similar to E. nicippe's host plant of Chamaecrista fasciculata. Eggs deposited on P. tenellus are capable of hatching but larvae cannot develop on it.

=== Larvae ===
Larvae are pale green with a narrow white lateral stripe running along each side of the body and are covered with short hairs. E. nicippe larvae are found to consume exclusively foliage compared to other members of Pieridae.

=== Pupae ===
The chrysalis ranges from pale green early in development to a darker brown-black or solid black coloration later in the life cycle which provides camouflage across the different substrates where pupation occurs. Controlled cross-breeding experiments have demonstrated that pupal coloration is independent of adult wing pattern or seasonal morph, with morphologically identical adult butterflies emerging from both solid green and solid black pupae.

=== Adults ===
Adults exhibit pronounced seasonal dimorphism. Summer form individuals have bright yellow undersides with brick-red markings, while winter form individuals are significantly browner and have a more heavily pattern. This seasonal variation reflects a state of reproductive diapause in winter adults, during which reproduction is suspended and individuals may persist for extended periods.

When compared to most migratory butterfly species in the region, E. nicippe maintained a net northward movement throughout the fall season.

== Behavior and ecology ==
=== Feeding ===
Adults take nectar from a wide variety of flowering plants and show a general preference for open, sunny habitats where flowering plants are readily accessible, including old fields, roadsides, and the margins of woodlands, swamps, and ponds. However, no strong preference for a particular nectar source has been recorded among sleepy oranges.

Male E. nicippe butterflies also participate in mudpuddling behavior where they aggregate on wet soil or mud and form massive groups in low lying riparian zones. Many caterpillar host plants and adult flower nectars are deficient in minerals, leading to male butterflies experiencing low dietary sodium and delivering it to females post mud puddling via the spermatophore during mating, which enhances the female's egg laying capacity and longevity, although this mechanism and its benefits has not been verified in E. nicippe directly.

== Habitat ==
Eurema nicippe is a specialist of open and low-elevation habitats with demonstrating strong preference towards open patches when found at the border of open patches of land and an adjacent forest environment. Upon entering the forest, Eurema nicippe would return to the open patch rather than crossing into the forest, classifying E. nicippe as possessing reflective behavior.

== Food resources ==
=== Caterpillars ===
==== Host plants ====
The larval host plants of Eurema nicippe are within the legume family Fabaceae with recorded host plants including Chamaecrista fasciculata (Partridge Pea), Chamaecrista nictitans (Sensitive Partridge Pea), Senna hebecarpa, Senna ligustrina, Senna marilandica, Senna mexicana, Senna obtusifolia, Senna occidentalis, and Aeschynomene americana.

== Parental care ==
=== Oviposition ===
Females of Eurema nicippe lay eggs on the underside of leaves of suitable host plants. The oviposition decision involves multiple stages. Females are initially attracted to potential host plants by visual cues such as the overall leaf form and arrangement of the host plant.

While visual cues dominate oviposition decision making, contact chemosensory cues such as gustation or olfaction on the leaf surface further serve as a filter for E. nicippe oviposition decision making.

Mistakes during oviposition due to morphological similarities in non host plants led to an increase in oviposition on Aeschynomene americana (Joint Vetch), making it a secondary host plant in Florida.

== Physiology ==
Adults of E. nicippe possess median neurosecretory cells in the protocerebrum of the adult brain that are immunoreactive with antisera raised against both N-terminal and C-terminal halves of the diuretic hormone of Manduca sexta. In M. sexta, these cells produce a corticotropin releasing factor-like diuretic neuropeptide that regulates fluid secretion via the Malpighian tubules, with immunoreactivity observed in E. nicippe indicating the presence of homologous neuropeptides in the adult butterfly brain.

== Enemies ==
Several ant species associated with the nectar of Senna host plants act as antagonists of E. nicippe larvae. Extrafloral nectaries on Senna species attract foraging ants that patrol plant surfaces which can substantially reduce larval survival. Specifically, ant defense operates post-oviposition by removing small larvae rather than preventing egg laying.

== Conservation ==
The sleepy orange is assessed as Least Concern on the IUCN Red List. It has a continuous distribution from Central America through the southern United States with a tolerance towards disturbed and agricultural habitats and stable population trends across its range. The species' multi brood reproductive strategy and broad host plant range within Fabaceae contribute to its ecological resilience.
