= SCH-202,596 =

Chemical compound

Clinical data
- ATC code: none

Identifiers
- IUPAC name: methyl (2S)-5,7-dichloro-5'-methoxy-6-methyl-3,3'-dioxo-4-([(1R,4R,5R,6S)-4,5,6-trihydroxy-2-methoxycarbonyl-1-cyclohex-2-enyl]oxy)spiro[1-benzofuran-2,6'-cyclohexa-1,4-diene]-1'-carboxylate
- CAS Number: 196615-89-1
- PubChem CID: 11758032
- IUPHAR/BPS: 6128
- ChemSpider: 9932733
- UNII: 8Q8NDZ467M
- CompTox Dashboard (EPA): DTXSID401032022

Chemical and physical data
- Formula: C_{25}H_{22}Cl_{2}O_{12}
- Molar mass: 585.34 g·mol^{−1}
- 3D model (JSmol): Interactive image
- SMILES: O=C(OC)\C4=C\[C@@H](O)[C@@H](O)[C@H](O)[C@@H]4Oc2c(Cl)c(c(Cl)c1O[C@@]3(C(=O)c12)C(/C(=O)OC)=C\C(=O)\C=C3\OC)C
- InChI: InChI=1S/C25H22Cl2O12/c1-8-15(26)20(38-19-10(23(33)36-3)7-12(29)17(30)18(19)31)14-21(16(8)27)39-25(22(14)32)11(24(34)37-4)5-9(28)6-13(25)35-2/h5-7,12,17-19,29-31H,1-4H3/t12-,17-,18+,19-,25+/m1/s1; Key:LNGFWDFUPRZMJI-VEHFIHCQSA-N

SCH-202,596 is a natural product which is a metabolite derived from an Aspergillus fungus. It acts as a selective non-peptide antagonist for the receptor GAL-1, which is usually activated by the neuropeptide galanin. SCH-202,596 is used for scientific research into this still little characterised receptor subtype.

== See also ==
- chloramphenicol
