= Galanin-like peptide =

Protein family

GALP

Identifiers
- Aliases: GALP, galanin like peptide
- External IDs: OMIM: 611178; MGI: 2663979; GeneCards: GALP

Gene location (Human)
Chr.	Chromosome 19 (human)
Band	19q13.43	Start	56,176,008 bp
Band	19q13.43	End	56,185,775 bp

Gene location (Mouse)
Chr.	Chromosome 7 (mouse)
Band	7|7 A1	Start	6,200,089 bp
Band	7|7 A1	End	6,219,136 bp
RNA expression pattern
Bgee	Human / Mouse (ortholog); Top expressed in: right lobe of liver; sural nerve; ganglionic eminence; temporal lobe; amygdala; mesencephalon; substantia nigra; nucleus accumbens; prefrontal cortex; caudate nucleus / Top expressed in: testicle; secondary oocyte; lung; human kidney; More reference expression data
BioGPS	n/a
Gene ontology
Molecular function	hormone activity
Cellular component	extracellular region; cellular component
Biological process	response to insulin; response to hormone; regulation of appetite; neuropeptide signaling pathway; defense response to bacterium; behavioral response to starvation; antimicrobial humoral immune response mediated by antimicrobial peptide; regulation of signaling receptor activity; biological process; defense response to Gram-negative bacterium
Sources:Amigo / QuickGO
Orthologs
Databases	NCBI: entry; OMA: entry
Species	Human	Mouse
Entrez	85569	232836
Ensembl	ENSG00000197487	ENSMUSG00000034660
UniProt	Q9UBC7	Q810H5
RefSeq (mRNA)	NM_033106; NM_001145546	NM_178028
RefSeq (protein)	NP_001139018; NP_149097	NP_821171
Location (UCSC)	Chr 19: 56.18 – 56.19 Mb	Chr 7: 6.2 – 6.22 Mb
PubMed search
- Wikidata
View/Edit Human	View/Edit Mouse

Galanin-like peptide (GALP) is a neuropeptide present in humans and other mammals. It is a 60-amino acid polypeptide produced in the arcuate nucleus of the hypothalamus and the posterior pituitary gland. It is involved in the regulation of appetite and may also have other roles such as in inflammation, sex behavior, and stress.

Findings additionally suggest that GALP could play a function in energy metabolism due to its ability to maintain continual activation of the sympathetic nervous system (SNS) via thermogenesis, which refers to the production of heat within living organisms. In addition, the administration of GALP directly into the brain leads to a reduction in the secretion of thyroid-stimulating hormone (TSH), which indicates the involvement of GALP in the neuroendocrine regulation of the hypothalamic-pituitary-thyroid (HPT) axis, and further adding to the evidence of the role of GALP in energy homeostasis.

== Receptors ==
The canonical form of this peptide binds to the galanin receptors: GALR1, GALR2 and GALR3.

== Alternative splicing ==
An alternative splicing of GALP produces a second isoform called isoform 2 or (after signal peptide cleavage) alarin. This isoform acts as a vasoconstrictor and antibacterial, and the effects do not appear to be produced through binding with GALR1 or GALR2.
