= CCAP =

CCAP may refer to:

- CCAP Rhode Island, a child support welfare program
- The Center for Clean Air Policy
- Chicago Climate Action Plan
- Church of Central Africa Presbyterian
- Crustacean cardioactive peptide
- Culture Collection of Algae and Protozoa
- China Certification Centre for Automotive Products
- CCAP cable (Coopérative de câblodistribution de l'arrière-pays)
