= Galanin receptor =

InterPro Family

galanin receptor 1

Identifiers
- Symbol: GALR1
- Alt. symbols: GALNR1, GALNR
- NCBI gene: 2587
- HGNC: 4132
- OMIM: 600377
- RefSeq: NM_001480
- UniProt: P47211

Other data
- Locus: Chr. 18 q23
Search for
- Structures: Swiss-model
- Domains: InterPro

galanin receptor 2

Identifiers
- Symbol: GALR2
- NCBI gene: 8811
- HGNC: 4133
- OMIM: 603691
- RefSeq: NM_003857
- UniProt: O43603

Other data
- Locus: Chr. 17 q25.3
Search for
- Structures: Swiss-model
- Domains: InterPro

galanin receptor 3

Identifiers
- Symbol: GALR3
- NCBI gene: 8484
- HGNC: 4134
- OMIM: 603692
- RefSeq: NM_003614
- UniProt: O60755

Other data
- Locus: Chr. 22 q12.2-13.1
Search for
- Structures: Swiss-model
- Domains: InterPro

The galanin receptor is a G protein-coupled receptor, or metabotropic receptor which binds galanin.

Galanin receptors can be found throughout the peripheral and central nervous systems and the endocrine system. So far three subtypes are known to exist: GAL-R1, GAL-R2, and GAL-R3. The specific function of each subtype remains to be fully elucidated, although as of 2009 great progress is currently being made in this respect with the generation of receptor subtype-specific knockout mice, and the first selective ligands for galanin receptor subtypes. Selective galanin agonists are anticonvulsant, while antagonists produce antidepressant and anxiolytic effects in animals, so either agonist or antagonist ligands for the galanin receptors may be potentially therapeutic compounds in humans.

== Ligands ==
=== Agonists ===
Non-selective

- Galanin
- Galanin 1-15 fragment
- Galanin-like peptide - agonist at GAL_{1} and GAL_{2} but not GAL_{3}
- Galmic
- Galnon
- NAX 5055
- D-Gal(7-Ahp)-B2

GAL_{1} selective

- M617

GAL_{1/2} selective

- M1154 - has no GalR3 interaction

GAL_{2} selective

- Galanin 2-11 amide - also called AR-M 1896, anticonvulsant in mice, CAS# 367518–31–8
- M1145 - selective compared to both GalR1 and GalR3
- M1153 - selective compared to both GalR1 and GalR3
- CYM 2503 (positive allosteric modulator)

=== Antagonists ===
Non-selective

- M35 peptide

GAL_{1} selective

- SCH-202,596

GAL_{2} selective

- M871 peptide

GAL_{3} selective

- SNAP-37889
- SNAP-398,299
