= GPR151 =

Protein-coding gene in the species Homo sapiens

Identifiers
- Aliases: GPR151, GALR4, GALRL, GPCR, PGR7, G protein-coupled receptor 151, GPCR-2037
- External IDs: OMIM: 618487; MGI: 2441887; GeneCards: GPR151

Gene location (Human)
Chr.	Chromosome 5 (human)
Band	5q32	Start	146,513,144 bp
Band	5q32	End	146,516,190 bp

Gene location (Mouse)
Chr.	Chromosome 18 (mouse)
Band	18|18 B3	Start	42,710,946 bp
Band	18|18 B3	End	42,712,717 bp
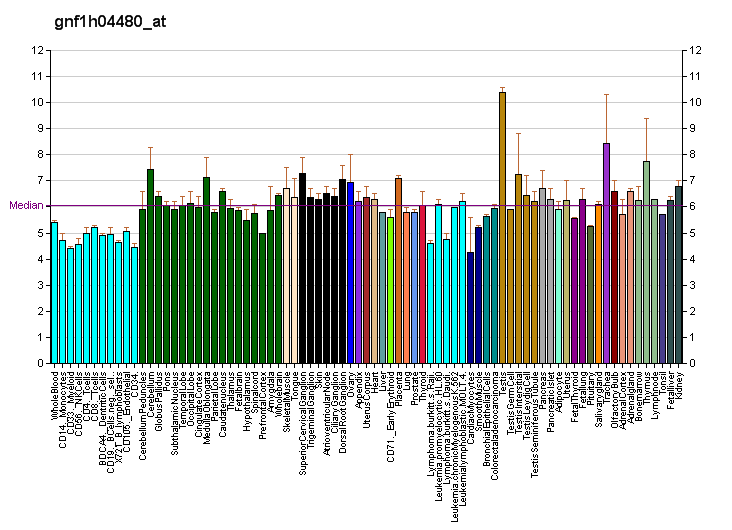
RNA expression pattern
Bgee	Human / Mouse (ortholog); Top expressed in: prefrontal cortex; C1 segment; Brodmann area 9; superior frontal gyrus; primary visual cortex; ganglionic eminence; anterior cingulate cortex; substantia nigra; right frontal lobe; putamen / Top expressed in: habenula; lumbar spinal ganglion; epithelium of small intestine; paraventricular nucleus of thalamus; embryo; blastocyst; lateral habenular nucleus; gastrula; central medial nucleus; jejunum; More reference expression data
BioGPS	More reference expression data
Gene ontology
Molecular function	G protein-coupled receptor activity; signal transducer activity
Cellular component	integral component of membrane; plasma membrane; membrane; integral component of plasma membrane
Biological process	G protein-coupled receptor signaling pathway; signal transduction
Sources:Amigo / QuickGO
Orthologs
Databases	NCBI: entry; OMA: entry
Species	Human	Mouse
Entrez	134391	240239
Ensembl	ENSG00000173250	ENSMUSG00000042816
UniProt	Q8TDV0	Q7TSN6
RefSeq (mRNA)	NM_194251	NM_181543
RefSeq (protein)	NP_919227	NP_853521
Location (UCSC)	Chr 5: 146.51 – 146.52 Mb	Chr 18: 42.71 – 42.71 Mb
PubMed search
- Wikidata
View/Edit Human	View/Edit Mouse

G-protein coupled receptor 151 is a protein that in humans is encoded by the GPR151 gene. It is weakly activated by galanin, but its endogenous ligand remains unknown. Studies have suggested GPR151 may play a role in several clinically significant processes such as inflammation, pain perception and reward-seeking behavior as well as hepatic glucose production, but further research into its function has been limited so far by a lack of selective agonists and antagonists for this receptor, with most research to date using knockout mice.
