= Bursicon =

Bursicon (from the Greek bursikos, pertaining to tanning) is an insect hormone which mediates tanning in the cuticle of adult flies. This hormone was identified by Gottfried S. Fraenkel with his student Catherine Hsiao in 1965.

== Structure ==
The molecular structure of the hormone has been characterized rather recently. Bursicon is a 30 kDa neurohormone heterodimeric protein which is encoded by CG13419 gene and made of two cysteine knot subunits, Burs-α and Burs-β. It is nondialyzable and loses its activity in alcohol, acetone, some proteases and trichloroacetate, renaturates after adding ammonium sulfate.

== Function ==
Bursicon plays a very important role in insect wing expansion during the last step of metamorphosis: maturation of the wing. At this time, the newly emerged adult removes dead cells of larval tissues. In Drosophila and Lucilia cuprina fly, the epidermis of wing is detached by extensive cell death apoptosis, at the time of wing spreading.

The cells that undergo death are removed from the wing cuticle and are absorbed into the thoracic cavity through wing veins. Subsequent wing maturation is disrupted if the process of cell death is inhibited or delayed somehow.

Bursicon is released just after eclosion and induces epidermis cell death. At the same time it hastens the tanning reaction, and hardens the newly expanded cuticle of the wing.

== Where the peptide is found ==
Bursicon is found in different insects and considered to be unspecific. It is produced by median neurosecretory cells in the brain, circulates in blood and stored in corpora cardiaca.

The structure of the protein has been investigated well in fruit fly (Drosophila melanogaster), and in some insect species bursicon gene has been sequenced, including the mosquito (Anopheles gambiae), cricket (Gryllus bimaculatus), locust (Locusta migratoria), and mealworm (Tenebrio molitor).

The hormone is also present in the silkworm (Bombyx mori), blow fly (Calliphora erythrocephala), and cockroach (Periplaneta americana).

== Effect of absence ==
Firstly, mutants of Drosophila melanogaster that lack bursicon gene can not spread their wings after eclosion. Secondly, the elongated abdomen shape of a newly eclosed fly remains for a much longer period of time. In addition, the abdomen of a fly is less melanized.

Using hybridization and immunocytochemistry it has been shown that bursicon is colocalized with Crustacean Cardioactive Peptide (CCAP). CCAP is responsible for activation of the ecdysis motor program. Mutant flies that had a defect in CCAP neurons also couldn’t express bursicon.
