= Powder puff (disambiguation) =

Powder puff is a piece of soft material used for the application of powder. The term may also refer to one of the following:

- Powderpuff (sports), female divisions for typically male sports, in some contexts
  - Powder Puff Derby (1947) (1947–1977), annual air race for women pilots
- "Powder puff", a type of ballet tutu
- Powder-puff plant (disambiguation), several plants
- Powderpuff, a type of the Chinese Crested Dog breed

== See also ==
- The Powerpuff Girls, an American animated Superhero show
