= Galanin =

GAL

Identifiers
- Aliases: GAL, GAL-GMAP, GALN, GLNN, GMAP, ETL8, galanin and GMAP prepropeptide
- External IDs: OMIM: 137035; MGI: 95637; HomoloGene: 7724; GeneCards: GAL; OMA:GAL - orthologs

Gene location (Human)
Chr.	Chromosome 11 (human)
Band	11q13.2	Start	68,683,779 bp
Band	11q13.2	End	68,691,175 bp

Gene location (Mouse)
Chr.	Chromosome 19 (mouse)
Band	19 A|19 3.16 cM	Start	3,459,915 bp
Band	19 A|19 3.16 cM	End	3,464,544 bp
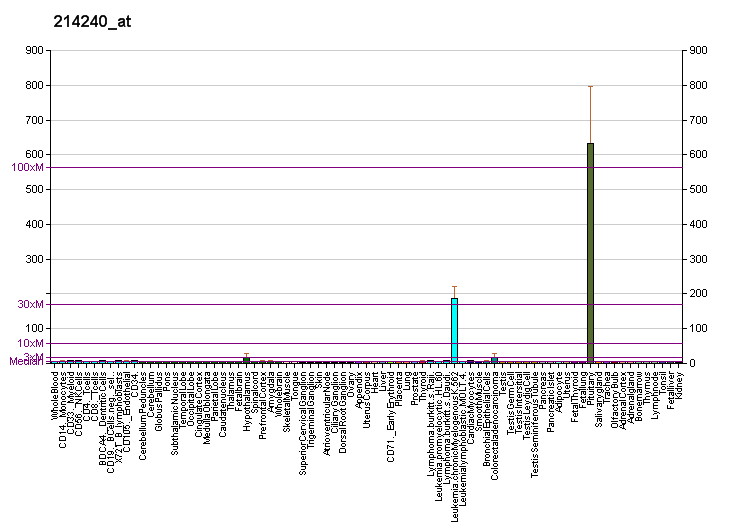
RNA expression pattern
Bgee	Human / Mouse (ortholog); Top expressed in: anterior pituitary; skin of thigh; vulva; skin of arm; hypothalamus; muscle layer of sigmoid colon; testicle; decidua; appendix; gastric mucosa / Top expressed in: dorsomedial hypothalamic nucleus; arcuate nucleus; lateral hypothalamus; trigeminal ganglion; pyloric antrum; supraoptic nucleus; lumbar spinal ganglion; calvaria; adrenal gland; atrioventricular canal; More reference expression data
BioGPS	More reference expression data
Gene ontology
Molecular function	hormone activity; galanin receptor activity; type 1 galanin receptor binding; type 2 galanin receptor binding; type 3 galanin receptor binding; neuropeptide hormone activity; protein binding
Cellular component	extracellular region; cytoplasm; Golgi apparatus; soma; secretory granule; extracellular space
Biological process	negative regulation of cell population proliferation; positive regulation of timing of catagen; feeding behavior; positive regulation of cortisol secretion; positive regulation of large conductance calcium-activated potassium channel activity; regulation of glucocorticoid metabolic process; response to immobilization stress; insulin secretion; protein kinase A signaling; cAMP-mediated signaling; positive regulation of apoptotic process; nervous system development; negative regulation of root hair elongation; response to estrogen; response to insulin; positive regulation of transcription by RNA polymerase II; inflammatory response; negative regulation of lymphocyte proliferation; neuropeptide signaling pathway; regulation of signaling receptor activity; G protein-coupled receptor signaling pathway
Sources:Amigo / QuickGO
Orthologs
Species	Human	Mouse
Entrez	51083	14419
Ensembl	ENSG00000069482	ENSMUSG00000024907
UniProt	P22466	P47212
RefSeq (mRNA)	NM_015973	NM_010253; NM_001329667
RefSeq (protein)	NP_057057	NP_001316596; NP_034383
Location (UCSC)	Chr 11: 68.68 – 68.69 Mb	Chr 19: 3.46 – 3.46 Mb
PubMed search
- Wikidata
View/Edit Human	View/Edit Mouse

Galanin
Identifiers
- CAS Number: 88813-36-9
- ChemSpider: none
- ChEMBL: ChEMBL501079

Chemical and physical data
- Formula: C_{146}H_{213}N_{43}O_{40}
- Molar mass: 3210.571 g·mol^{−1}

Galanin is a neuropeptide encoded by the GAL gene, that is widely expressed in the brain, spinal cord, and gut of humans as well as other mammals. Galanin signaling occurs through three G protein-coupled receptors.

Much of galanin's functional role is still undiscovered. Galanin is closely involved in the modulation and inhibition of action potentials in neurons. Galanin has been implicated in many biologically diverse functions, including: nociception, waking and sleep regulation, cognition, feeding, regulation of mood, regulation of blood pressure, it also has roles in development as well as acting as a trophic factor. Galanin neurons in the medial preoptic area of the hypothalamus may govern parental behaviour. Galanin is linked to a number of diseases including Alzheimer's disease, epilepsy as well as depression, eating disorders, cancer, and addiction. Galanin appears to have neuroprotective activity as its biosynthesis is increased 2-10 fold upon axotomy in the peripheral nervous system as well as when seizure activity occurs in the brain. It may also promote neurogenesis.

Galanin is predominantly an inhibitory, hyperpolarizing neuropeptide and as such inhibits neurotransmitter release. Galanin is often co-localized with classical neurotransmitters such as acetylcholine, serotonin, and norepinephrine, and also with other neuromodulators such as neuropeptide Y, substance P, and vasoactive intestinal peptide.

== Discovery ==
Galanin was first identified from porcine intestinal extracts in 1978 by Professor Viktor Mutt and colleagues at the Karolinska Institute, Sweden using a chemical assay technique that detects peptides according to its C-terminal alanine amide structure. Galanin is so-called because it contains an N-terminal glycine residue and a C-terminal alanine. The structure of galanin was determined in 1983 by the same team, and the cDNA of galanin was cloned from a rat anterior pituitary library in 1987.

== Tissue distribution ==
Galanin is located predominantly in the central nervous system and gastrointestinal tract. Within the central nervous system, highest concentrations are found in the hypothalamus, with lower levels in the cortex and brainstem. In the hypothalamus, it is for example found in the ventrolateral preoptic nucleus where it has sleep-promoting function. Within the brain, galanin has also been found in the ventral forebrain and amygdala. Along with this, the immune reaction of galanin in the brain is centered in the hypothalamopituitary. Gastrointestinal galanin is most abundant in the duodenum, with lower concentrations in the stomach, small intestine, and colon. Galanin is also expressed in the skin where is serves anti-inflammatory functions. Specifically, it has been found in keratinocytes, eccrine sweat glands, and around blood vessels. Galanin has been found in endocrine tumors. Within gastric cancer cells, galanin has been found to have a tumor suppressive role, but hypermethylation has been shown to stop its tumor suppressive properties.

== Structure ==
Endogenously occurring galanin sequences
Species	Sequence
Pig	GWTLNSAGYLLGPHA**IDN**HRSF**H**DK**Y**GL**A**
Human	GWTLNSAGYLLGPHA**VGN**HRSF**S**DK**N**GL**TS**(NH2)
Cow	GWTLNSAGYLLGPHA**LDS**HRSF**Q**DK**H**GL**A**
Rat	GWTLNSAGYLLGPHA**IDN**HRSF**S**DK**H**GL**T**
Variable sites given in bold.

Galanin is a peptide consisting of a chain of 29 amino acids (30 amino acids in humans) produced from the cleavage of a 123-amino acid protein known as prepro galanin, which is encoded by the GAL gene. The sequence of this gene is highly conserved among mammals, showing over 85% homology between rat, mouse, porcine, bovine, and human sequences. In these animal forms, the first 15 amino acids from the N-terminus are identical, but amino acids differ at several positions on the C-terminal end of the protein.

Even though the protein structures are very similar, they often have very different effects in different animals. For example, porcine and rat galanin inhibit glucose-induced insulin secretion in rats and dogs but have no effect on insulin secretion in humans. This demonstrates that it is essential to study the effects of galanin and other regulatory peptides in their autologous species.

The galanin family of protein consists of four proteins, of which GAL was the first to be identified. The second was galanin message-associated protein (GMAP), a 59- or 60-amino acid peptide also formed from the cleavage of prepro galanin. The other two peptides, galanin-like peptide (GALP) and alarin, were identified relatively recently and are both encoded for in the same gene, the prepro GALP gene. GALP and alarin are produced by different post-transcriptional splicing of this gene.

Galanin

Identifiers
- Symbol: Galanin
- Pfam: PF01296
- InterPro: IPR008174
- PROSITE: PDOC00673
Available protein structures:
- PDB: IPR008174 PF01296 (ECOD; PDBsum)
- AlphaFold: IPR008174; PF01296

Galanin message associated peptide (GMAP)

Identifiers
- Symbol: GMAP
- Pfam: PF06540
- InterPro: IPR013068
Available protein structures:
- PDB: IPR013068 PF06540 (ECOD; PDBsum)
- AlphaFold: IPR013068; PF06540

== Receptors ==
Galanin signalling occurs through three classes of receptors, GALR1, GALR2, and GALR3, which are all part of the G protein-coupled receptor (GPCR) superfamily. Galanin receptors are expressed in the central nervous system, in the pancreas, and on solid tumours. The level of expression of the different receptors varies at each location, and this distribution changes after injury to neurons. Experiments into the function of the receptor subtypes involve mostly genetic knockout mice. The location of the receptor and the combination of receptors that are inhibited or stimulated heavily affect the outcome of galanin signalling.

== Clinical characteristics ==
=== Appetite ===
Injections of galanin into the lateral ventricle or directly into the hypothalamus of rats creates the urge to feed, with a preference for eating fats. Galanin also regulates glucose metabolism and can potentially alleviate symptoms of Diabetes Type II due to its interaction with insulin resistance. Galanin is an inhibitor of pancreatic secretion of insulin.

=== Addiction ===
Galanin plays a role in addiction regulation. It is involved in repeated alcohol intake. Along with addiction to alcohol, galanin has been shown to play a role in addiction to nicotine and opiates.

=== Alzheimer's disease ===
One of the pathological features of the brain in the later stages of Alzheimer's disease is the presence of overgrown GAL-containing fibres innervating the surviving cholinergic neurons. Another feature is an increase in the expression of GAL and GAL receptors, in which increases of up to 200% have been observed in postmortem brains of Alzheimer's patients. The cause and role of this increase is poorly understood.

It has been suggested that the hyper-innervation acts to promote the death of these neurons and that the inhibitory effect of galanin on cholinergic neurons worsened the degeneration of cognitive function in patients by decreasing the amount of acetylcholine available to these neurons.

A second hypothesis has been generated based on data that suggest GAL is involved in protecting the hippocampus from excitotoxic damage and the neurons in the cholinergic basal forebrain from amyloid toxicity.

=== Cognitive performance ===
Galanin participates in cognitive performance and has been shown to weaken learning and cognition.

=== Depression ===
Noradrenaline and serotonin, two neurotransmitters involved in depression, are both co-expressed and modulated by galanin, suggesting that galanin plays a role in the regulation of depression. Stimulation of the Gal1 and Gal3 receptors result in depression-like behaviors, whereas stimulation of the Gal2 receptor results in reduced depression-like behaviors. Currently, one of the potential mechanisms for this is that galanin stimulates the hypothalamus-pituitary-adrenal axis, which leads to an increase in glucocorticoid secretion. Increased levels of glucocorticoid hormones is common in those who have depression.

=== Endocrine ===
Galanin inhibits the secretion of insulin and somatostatin and stimulates the secretion of glucagon, prolactin, somatotropin, adrenocorticotropin, luteinizing hormone, foliculotropin, growth hormone-releasing hormone, hypothalamic gonadotropin-releasing hormone, and corticotropin-releasing hormone.

=== Epilepsy ===
Galanin in the hippocampus is an inhibitor of glutamate but not of GABA. This means that galanin is capable of increasing the seizure threshold and, therefore, is expected to act as an anticonvulsant. To be specific, GalR1 has been linked to the suppression of spontaneous seizures. An agonist antiepileptic drug candidate is NAX 5055.

=== In development ===
It has been shown that galanin plays a role in the control of the early post-natal neural development of the dorsal root ganglion (DRG). Galanin-mutant animals show a 13% decrease in the number of adult DRG cells as well as a 24% decrease in the percentage of cells expressing substance P. This suggests that the cell loss by apoptosis that usually occurs in the developing DRG is regulated by galanin and that the absence of galanin results in an increase in the number of cells that die.

=== Pain and neuroprotection ===
Galanin plays an inhibitory role in pain processing, with high doses having been shown to reduce pain. When galanin is added to the spinal cord, neuropathic pain is reduced. Along with this, galanin is believed to be effective in reducing spinal hyperexcitability. Sensory neurons increasingly release galanin when they are damaged. An increase in the concentrations of galanin are also believed to be for neuroprotective reasons and lead to promoted neurogenesis. GalR2 activation is believed to mediate the survival role galanin plays in the dorsal root ganglion.

=== Parental role in mice ===
Galanin-expressing neurons in the medial preoptic area of the brain are responsible for regulating aggression towards pups by male mice.

Galanin-expressing neurons in the medial preoptic area are remodelled during pregnancy. Estrogen and progesterone genomic receptors in galanin (Gal)-expressing neurons control discrete aspected of plasticity.

== See also ==
- Galanin receptor
