= Cocaine and amphetamine regulated transcript =

Neuropeptide protein

CARTPT

Identifiers
- Aliases: CARTPT, CART, CART prepropeptide
- External IDs: OMIM: 602606; MGI: 1351330; GeneCards: CARTPT
Available structures
PDB	Ortholog search: PDBe RCSB
PDB	List of PDB id codes 1HY9

Gene location (Human)
Chr.	Chromosome 5 (human)
Band	5q13.2	Start	71,719,275 bp
Band	5q13.2	End	71,721,048 bp

Gene location (Mouse)
Chr.	Chromosome 13 (mouse)
Band	13|13 D1	Start	100,034,997 bp
Band	13|13 D1	End	100,037,599 bp
RNA expression pattern
Bgee	Human / Mouse (ortholog); Top expressed in: testicle; hypothalamus; middle temporal gyrus; right frontal lobe; Brodmann area 9; amygdala; ascending aorta; dorsal motor nucleus of vagus nerve; inferior olivary nucleus; Brodmann area 10 / Top expressed in: arcuate nucleus; median eminence; central gray substance of midbrain; olfactory epithelium; superior cervical ganglion; mammillary body; neural layer of retina; dorsomedial hypothalamic nucleus; external carotid artery; paraventricular nucleus of hypothalamus; More reference expression data
BioGPS	n/a
Gene ontology
Molecular function	protein binding; molecular function; neuropeptide hormone activity
Cellular component	secretory granule; extracellular region; extracellular space
Biological process	chemical synaptic transmission; regulation of bone remodeling; G protein-coupled receptor signaling pathway; adult feeding behavior; negative regulation of glucagon secretion; negative regulation of osteoclast differentiation; regulation of insulin secretion; positive regulation of transmission of nerve impulse; cell-cell signaling; negative regulation of appetite; circadian regulation of gene expression; positive regulation of blood pressure; somatostatin secretion; signal transduction; negative regulation of bone resorption; positive regulation of epinephrine secretion; neuropeptide signaling pathway; cellular response to starvation; regulation of signaling receptor activity; cellular glucose homeostasis
Sources:Amigo / QuickGO
Orthologs
Databases	NCBI: entry; OMA: entry
Species	Human	Mouse
Entrez	9607	27220
Ensembl	ENSG00000164326	ENSMUSG00000021647
UniProt	Q16568	P56388
RefSeq (mRNA)	NM_004291	NM_001081493; NM_013732
RefSeq (protein)	NP_004282	NP_001074962; NP_038760
Location (UCSC)	Chr 5: 71.72 – 71.72 Mb	Chr 13: 100.03 – 100.04 Mb
PubMed search
- Wikidata
View/Edit Human	View/Edit Mouse

CART
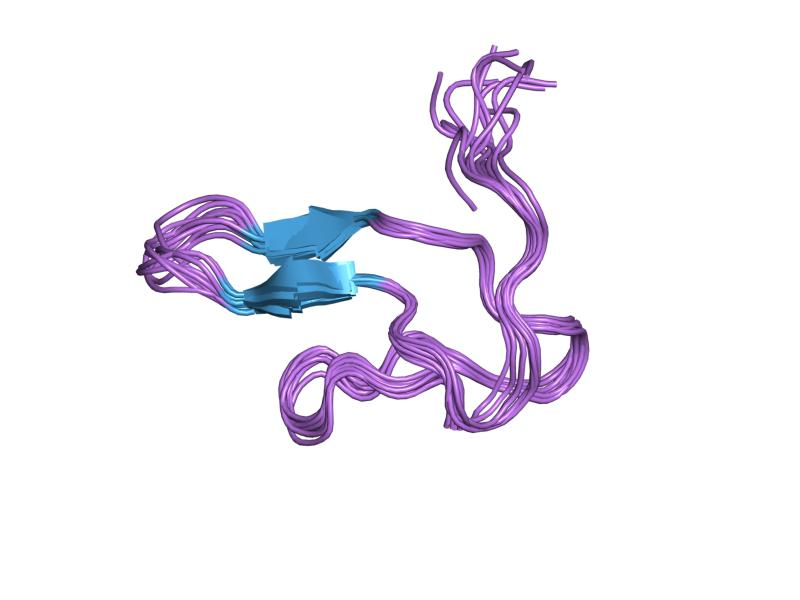
- cocaine- and amphetamine-regulated transcript

Identifiers
- Symbol: CART
- Pfam: PF06373
- InterPro: IPR009106
- SCOP2: 1hy9 / SCOPe / SUPFAM
Available protein structures:
- PDB: IPR009106 PF06373 (ECOD; PDBsum)
- AlphaFold: IPR009106; PF06373

Cocaine- and amphetamine-regulated transcript, also known as CART, is a neuropeptide protein that in humans is encoded by the CARTPT gene. CART appears to have roles in reward, feeding, and stress, and it has the functional properties of an endogenous psychostimulant.

== Function ==
CART is a neuropeptide that produces similar behavior in animals as cocaine and amphetamine, but conversely blocks the effects of cocaine when they are co-administered. The peptide is found in several areas, among them the ventral tegmental area (VTA) of the brain. When CART was injected into rat VTA, increased locomotor activity was seen, which is one of the signs of "central stimulation" caused by psychostimulants, such as cocaine and amphetamine. The same rats also tended to return to the place where they were injected. This is called conditioned place preference and is also seen after injection of cocaine.

CART peptides, in particular, CART(55–102), seem to have an important function in the regulation of energy homeostasis and interact with several hypothalamic appetite circuits. CART expression is regulated by several peripheral peptide hormones involved in appetite regulation, including leptin, cholecystokinin and ghrelin, with CART and cholecystokinin having synergistic effects on appetite regulation.

CART is released in response to repeated dopamine release in the nucleus accumbens, and may regulate the activity of neurons in this area. CART production is upregulated by CREB, a protein thought to be involved with the development of drug addiction, and CART may be an important therapeutic target in the treatment of stimulant abuse.

== Tissue distribution ==
CART is an anorectic peptide and is widely expressed in both the central and peripheral nervous systems, particularly concentrated in the hypothalamus. CART is also expressed outside of the nervous system in pituitary endocrine cells, adrenomedullary cells, islet somatostatin cells, and in rat antral gastrin cells. Other structures and pathways associated with CART expression include the mesolimbic pathway (linking the ventral tegmental area to the nucleus accumbens) and amygdala.

CART is also found in a subset of retinal ganglion cells (RGCs), the primary afferent neurons in the retina. Specifically, it labels ON/OFF Direction Selective Ganglion Cells (ooDSGCs), a subpopulation of RGCs that stratify in both the ON and OFF sublamina of the Inner Plexiform Layer (IPL) of the retina. It is also found in a subset of amacrine cells in the Inner Nuclear Layer. No role as of yet has been proposed for the location of this protein in these cell types.

== CART as a marker of optic nerve head astrocytes ==
Much of the current knowledge about astrocyte morphology and function has been derived from studies of gray matter protoplasmic astrocytes, while white matter fibrous astrocytes remain less characterized. A transcriptomic study using the RiboTag approach or Ribosome profiling, analyzed ribosome-associated mRNA from uninjured fibrous astrocytes in three regions: the unmyelinated optic nerve head, the myelinated optic nerve proper, and the corpus callosum. The analysis revealed that astrocytes from each region were transcriptionally distinct, with region-specific gene expression patterns and pathways. Differences in energy metabolism, particularly oxidative phosphorylation and mitochondrial protein translation, were identified as major distinguishing features. Optic nerve astrocytes also showed elevated expression of neuroinflammatory pathways compared to corpus callosum astrocytes. The study further identified CART prepropeptide as a novel marker of optic nerve head astrocytes, highlighting the functional diversity and heterogeneity of white matter astrocyte populations beyond what was previously recognized.

== Clinical significance ==
Studies of CART(54–102) action in rat lateral ventricle and amygdala suggest that CART plays a role in anxiety-like behavior, induced by ethanol withdrawal in rats. Studies on CART knock-out mice indicates that CART modulates the locomotor, conditioned place preference and cocaine self-administration effects of psychostimulants. This suggests a positive neuromodulatory action of CART on the effects of psychostimulants in rats. CART is altered in the ventral tegmental area of cocaine overdose victims, and a mutation in the CART gene is associated with alcoholism. By inhibiting the rewarding effects of cocaine, CART has a potential use in treating cocaine addiction.

CART peptides are inhibitors of food intake (anorectic) and closely associated with leptin and neuropeptide Y, two important food intake regulators. CART hypoactivity in the hypothalamus of depressed animals is associated with hyperphagia and weight gain. CART is thought to play a key role in the opioid mesolimbic dopamine circuit that modulates natural reward processes. CART also appears to play an important role in higher brain functions like cognition.

== History ==
CART was found by examining changes in the brain following cocaine or amphetamine administration. CART mRNA increased with cocaine administration. One of the goals was to find an endogenous anoretic substance. CART inhibited rat food intake by as much as 30 percent. When naturally occurring CART peptides were blocked by means of injecting antibodies for CART, feeding was increased. This led to suggestions that CART may play a role – though not being the only peptide – in satiety. In the late 1980s, researchers started to synthesize structurally cocaine-like and functionally CART-like substances in order to find medications that could help treat eating disorders as well as cocaine abuse. Chemically, these substances belong to phenyltropanes.

== CART receptor ==
The putative receptor target for CART evaded identification through 2011, however in vitro studies strongly suggested that CART binds to a specific G protein-coupled receptor coupled to Gi/Go, resulting in increased ERK release inside the cell. Results from a 2020 study suggested CART was a ligand for GPR160, but this finding was later challenged by the finding that GPR160 does not show specific binding to a radiolabeled version of CART either in a human cancer cell line that endogeneously expresses GPR160, or in a cell line that was transfected with GPR160. Furthermore, CART does not induce GPR160 mediated signaling in human cells.

Several fragments of CART have been tested to try and uncover the pharmacophore, but the natural splicing products CART(55–102) and CART(62–102) are still of highest activity, with the reduced activity of smaller fragments thought to indicate that a compact structure retaining all three of CART's disulphide bonds is preferred.

== See also ==
- Amphetamine
- Cocaine
