= CCAP Rhode Island =

Child care program in Rhode Island, US

The Child Care Assistance Program (CCAP) in Rhode Island is provided by the Rhode Island Department of Human Services, and is one of the child care programs in the state. The program helps families subsidize child care payments. It is a program designed for Rhode Island and uses guidelines and funding from the federal Child Care and Development Block Grant, along with state funding. CCAP, along with other federal and state programs, such as the Temporary Assistance for Needy Families, the Earned Income Tax Credit, and the Rhode Island Works program, CCAP is aimed to help impoverished children and their families financially.

== Eligibility ==
Like most state programs, there are requirements in eligibility to sign up and receive subsidies. It is aimed to help children under the age of 13, however, children 13-18 can receive subsidies if the child has special needs physically or mentally. Every child recipient must be a US citizen and resident of Rhode Island, however, the parent applying does not need to provide evidence of citizenship, but does need to provide proof of relation to the child, along with proof of living at the same residency.

Families must also provide verification of employment or schooling/training in order to be approved. There is a 20-hour a week minimum work requirement for low income families applying, or proof of attending some type of school or other program that would prevent a parent from taking care of the child. There are different thresholds for income and household size that determine how much assistance someone is eligible for. The general threshold are families whose income is under the 180 percent of the federal poverty line.

Providers for child care must also be approved in order to be given assistance. The recipients of the care can choose the type of care they want, as long as the provider has been deemed eligible. The providers are usually licensed day cares, but family members and even neighbors can act as a child care provider as long as they get approved by the program.

== Financing ==
CCAP is both federally funded and generally funded from the state, with a majority being federal. The Child Care and Development Block Grant is the basis for the federal funding the program receives, and state revenue takes care of the rest of the budget. For the year 2015, the total budget for CCAP was $51.1 million. State funding for expenditures in 2014 totaled 19.7%, and federal funding being 80.3% for that year. Total expenditure dropped from $73.8 million in 2007, but it has been steadily increasing since 2012. The number of people enrolled in CCAP affects its expenditures. As of 2019, there are currently 9,125 families in the state signed up for CCAP. Enrollment in 2007 was roughly 11,000, and dropped by 27.2% in 2008, which explains why expenditures also dropped around that time. Enrollment has also been increasing steadily since 2012.

== Child care providers ==
CCAP is open to recipients choosing whatever makes them comfortable with who provides child care for their children. There are three approved providers for CCAP: Licensed enters, certified family providers, and approved family/friends. Family or friends can become child care providers for recipients as long as they apply to become approved. As of 2014, Licensed centers were the largest settings where children received subsidies for their care, totaling 73.3% of all subsidies. Certified family providers were responsible for 25.8% of subsidies, as family/friends only totaled 0.8% of all subsidies.

== Recipients ==
The largest age group of children that received subsidies from CCAP were pre-school ages, which was 41% of all CCAP recipients in 2014. Regular school aged children took account for 35% of recipients, and infants/toddlers took up 23.2% of recipients for 2014.

CCAP applies to different amounts of child care needed. Recipients require a variety of different times, including: full day, evening, half day, pre/post school, weekend, or even summer child care. The program does not have a limit to the required time of child care a recipient needs.

== Expansion ==
There has been an interest in expanding the program, as the amount of child care assistance needed in the state is larger than the amount of care providers. This is especially true in more rural parts of the state, such as Foster, Glocester, Burrilliville, Coventry, and North Kingston. In these more spread out rural areas, there isn't as many providers that residents need. This creates long wait times to get a child care provider, sometimes up to 9 months. There has been no recent changes in CCAP that is helping expand child care to these areas.
