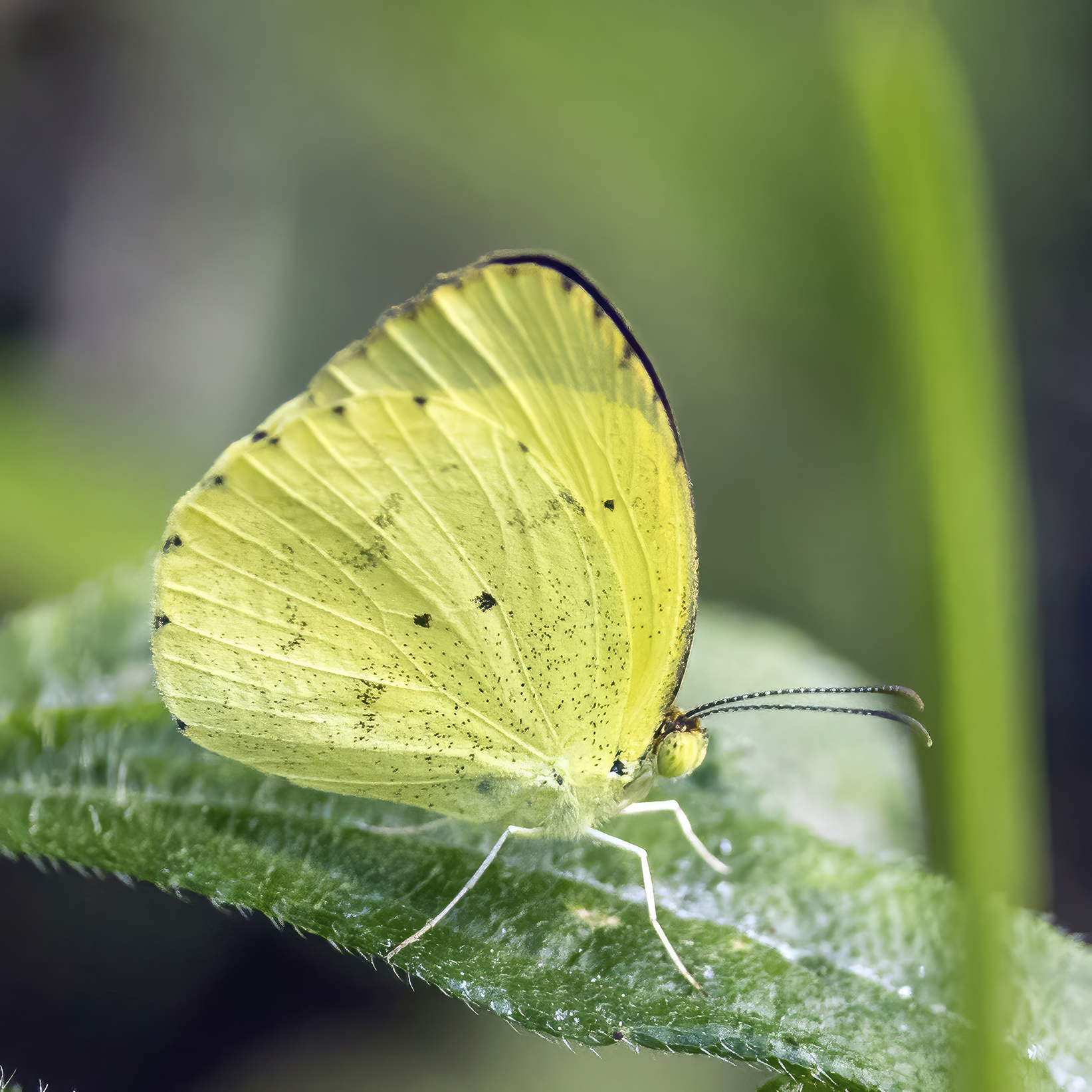
- Male
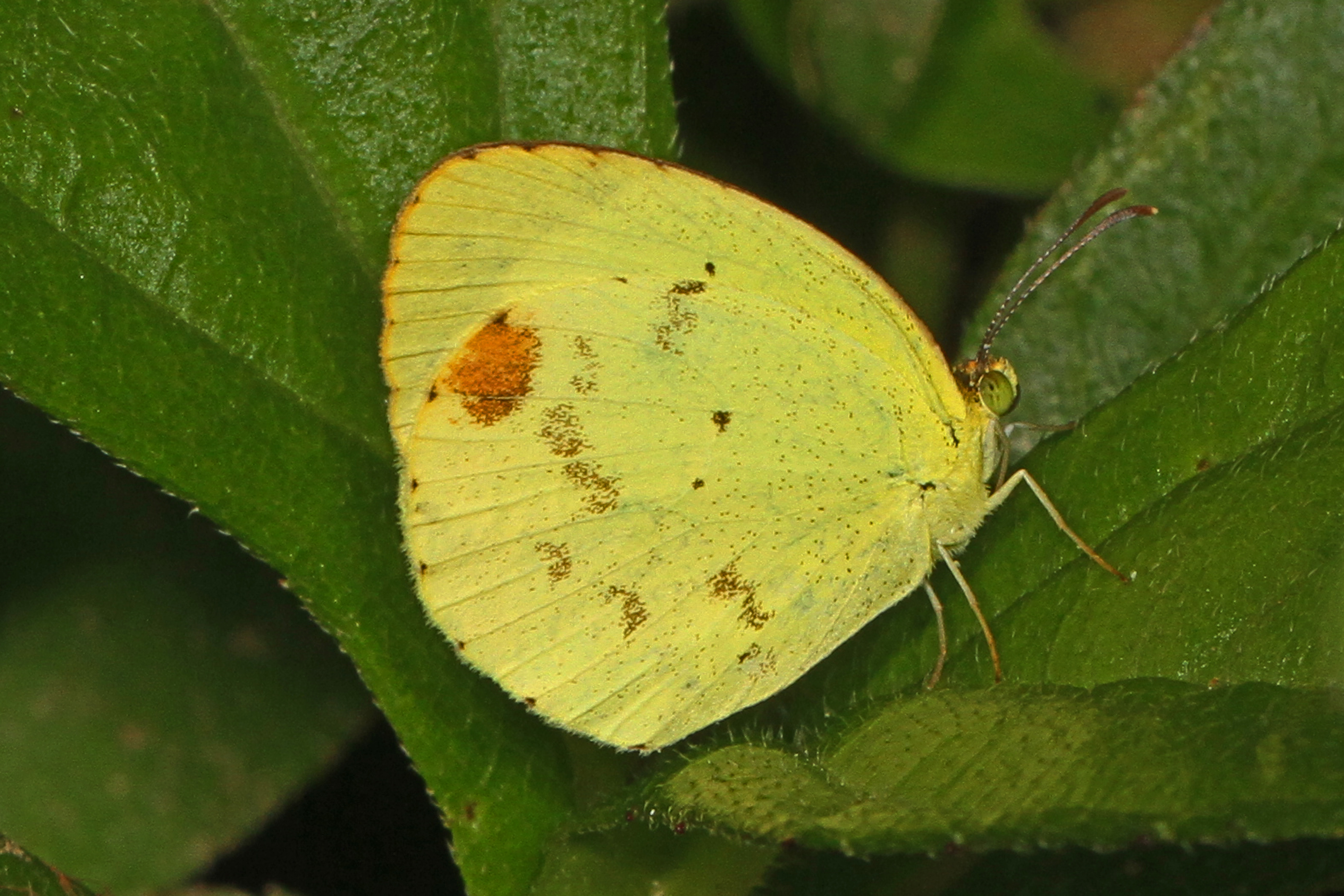
- Female; Both P. l. centralis in Belize

Conservation status
- Secure (NatureServe)

Scientific classification
- Kingdom: Animalia
- Phylum: Arthropoda
- Clade: Pancrustacea
- Class: Insecta
- Order: Lepidoptera
- Family: Pieridae
- Genus: Eurema
- Species: E. lisa

Binomial name
- Eurema lisa Boisduval & Le Conte (1829)

Subspecies
- Eurema lisa euterpe (Ménétries 1832); Eurema lisa centralis (Herrich-Schäffer 1865)

Synonyms
- Pyrisitia lisa Boisduval & Le Conte 1830); Xanthidia lisa (Boisduval & Le Conte 1829)

= Eurema lisa =

Species of butterfly

Eurema lisa, commonly known as the little yellow, little sulphur or little sulfur, is a butterfly species of subfamily Coliadinae that occurs in Central America and the southern part of North America.

== Description ==
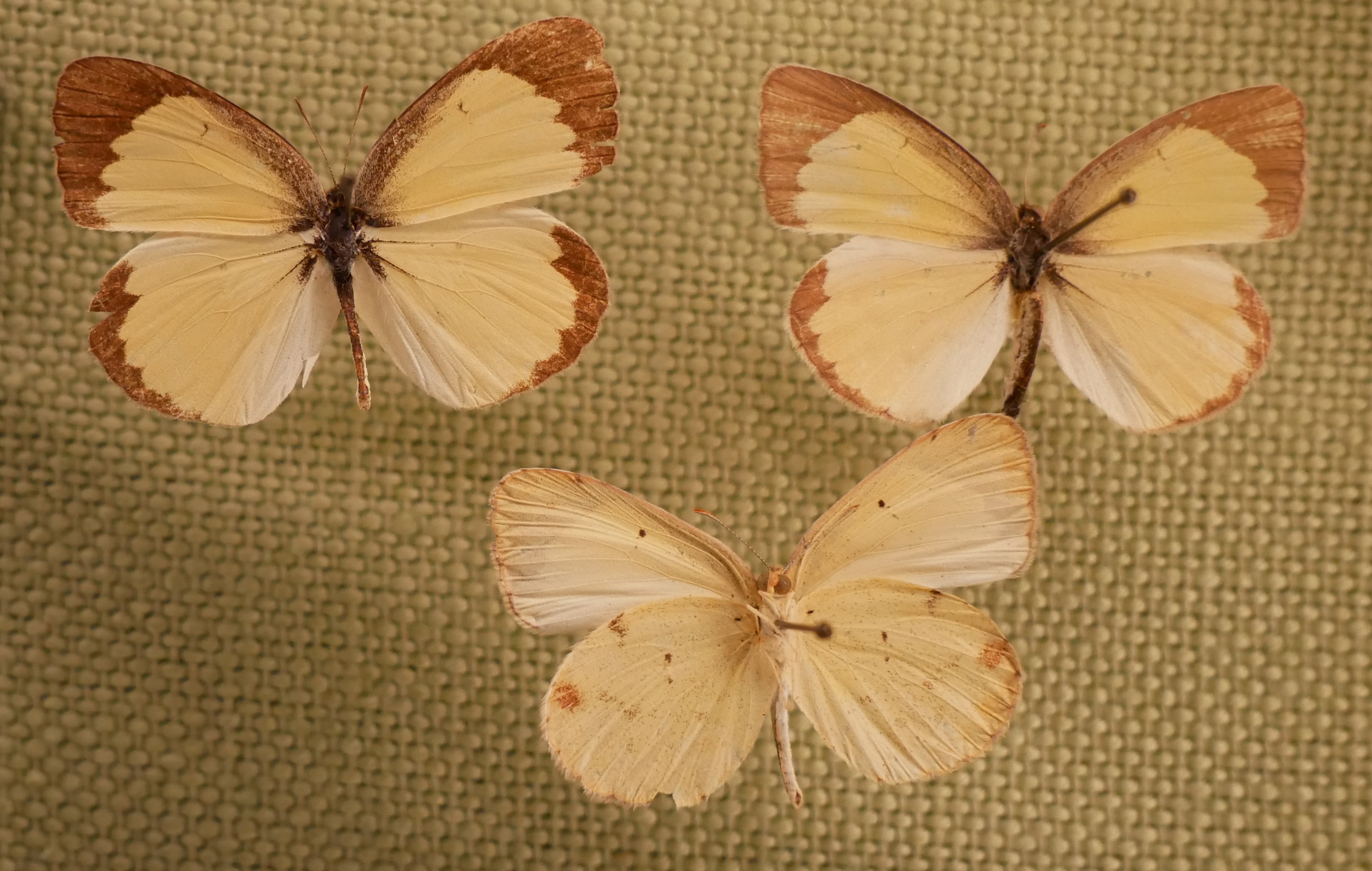
Eurema lisa museum specimens

The wingspan is between 32 and 44 mm, not to be confused with the sleepy orange that is large and orange not yellow. The dorsal view of the forewing has a broad dark margin and the hindwing's ventral view has two basal blacks spots. Females have a white morph (alba). Males reflect ultraviolet.

== Range and habitat ==
The little yellow lives in the southern United States and as far south as Costa Rica and the Antilles. They can seasonally colonize the northern United States (and as far north as Quebec). Migration to Bermuda occurs, but it is not established. Within their range they can be seen in open areas, most commonly old fields.

== Life cycle ==
In the southern part of its range there can be up to five broods per year, while in the northern range there are between one and three. During warm days males patrol for females so they can mate. Females lay eggs singly on the midveins or rachis of their host plant.

=== Larval foods ===
- Cassia fasciculata
- Cassia marilandica
- Cassia occidentalis
- Cassia nictitans
- Amphicarpa
- Desmanthus
- Glycine (in Puerto Rico)
- Mimosa pudica (in Antilles)
- Mimosa strigillosa

=== Adult foods ===
The adults feed on the nectar of species in the genus Aster.
