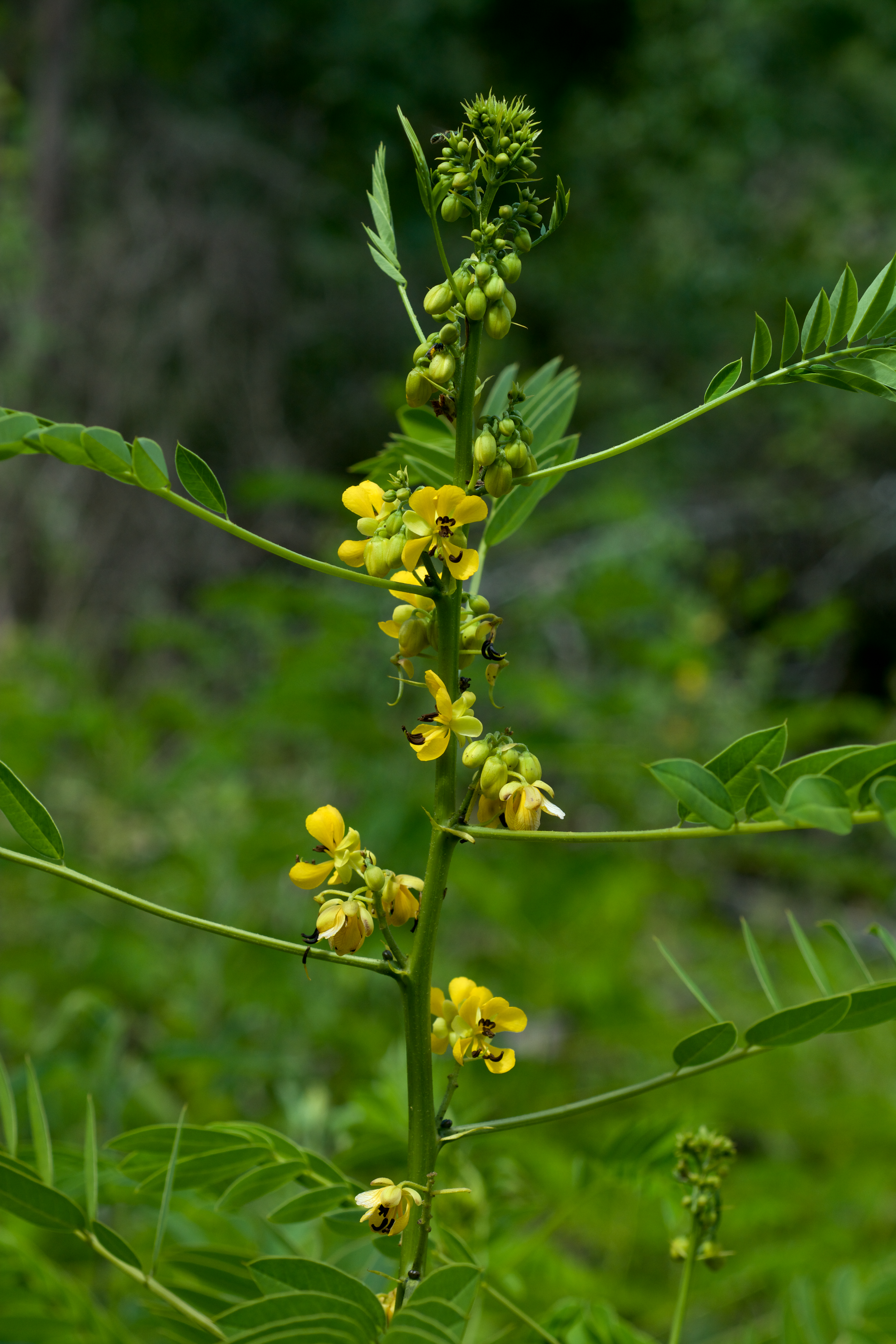

Conservation status
- Secure (NatureServe)

Scientific classification
- Kingdom: Plantae
- Clade: Tracheophytes
- Clade: Angiosperms
- Clade: Eudicots
- Clade: Rosids
- Order: Fabales
- Family: Fabaceae
- Subfamily: Caesalpinioideae
- Genus: Senna
- Species: S. marilandica

Binomial name
- Senna marilandica (L.) Link (1831, as "marylandica")

Synonyms
- Synonyms: Cassia acuminata Moench; Cassia marilandica L.; Cassia medsgeri Shafer; Cassia reflexa Salisb.; Cassia succedana Bellardi ex DC.; Ditremexa marilandica (L.) Britton & Rose; Ditremexa medsgeri (Shafer) Britton & Rose; Ditremexa nashii Britton & Rose; Senna riparia Raf.

= Senna marilandica =

Species of legume

Senna marilandica, commonly known as Maryland senna, Maryland wild senna, and wild senna, is a perennial flowering plant in the pea family (Fabaceae) native to the United States. It blooms in the summer with yellow flowers, followed by long seed pods, and can grow up to 2 m (6 ft) tall. It prefers average to wet soil.

== Description ==
Senna marilandica has green, round, unbranched stems rising from a shallow, fibrous root system, reaching a height of about 2 m (6 ft). The compound leaves are alternate and pinnate with four to eight pairs of opposite leaflets on each leaf. Leaflets are up to 6 cm (2.5 in) long and 2 cm (0.75 in) wide and are ovate to elliptic in shape.

The inflorescences are racemes of six to nine yellow flowers, appearing both from the leaf axils (axillary) and at the end of the stems (terminal). The axillary inflorescences are up to 15 cm (6 in) long, and the terminal inflorescence is about 15–30 cm (6–12 in) long. Each flower is about 2 cm (0.75 in) across, with five yellow petals and five greenish yellow sepals. The stamens have prominent brownish anthers. The flowers do not have nectaries. After the flowers are fertilized, drooping pea-like seed pods, up to 8 cm (3 in) long, appear.

== Distribution and habitat ==
S. marilandica is native in the United States from Nebraska to the west, Florida and Texas to the south, Wisconsin to the north, and New York to the east. It is a species of special concern in Wisconsin. The plant is found in woodland edges, open fields, and thickets, and in moist areas such as riverbanks and moist prairies.

== Ecology ==
The flowers bloom from early July through late August, and the seed pods form from early August through late September. Bumblebees, butterflies, and solitary bees visit the flowers. Although the flowers do not have nectaries, extrafloral nectaries are located at the base of the leaves that are higher on the stem, in the inflorescence, and ants, parasitic wasps, and lady beetles feed on the nectar.

Unlike many members of the pea family, S. marilandica is not nodulated by nitrogen-fixing bacteria.

S. marilandica is a larval host to the cloudless sulphur (Phoebis sennae), orange-barred sulphur (Phoebis philea), sleepy orange (Eurema nicippe), and little sulphur (Eurema lisa) butterflies.

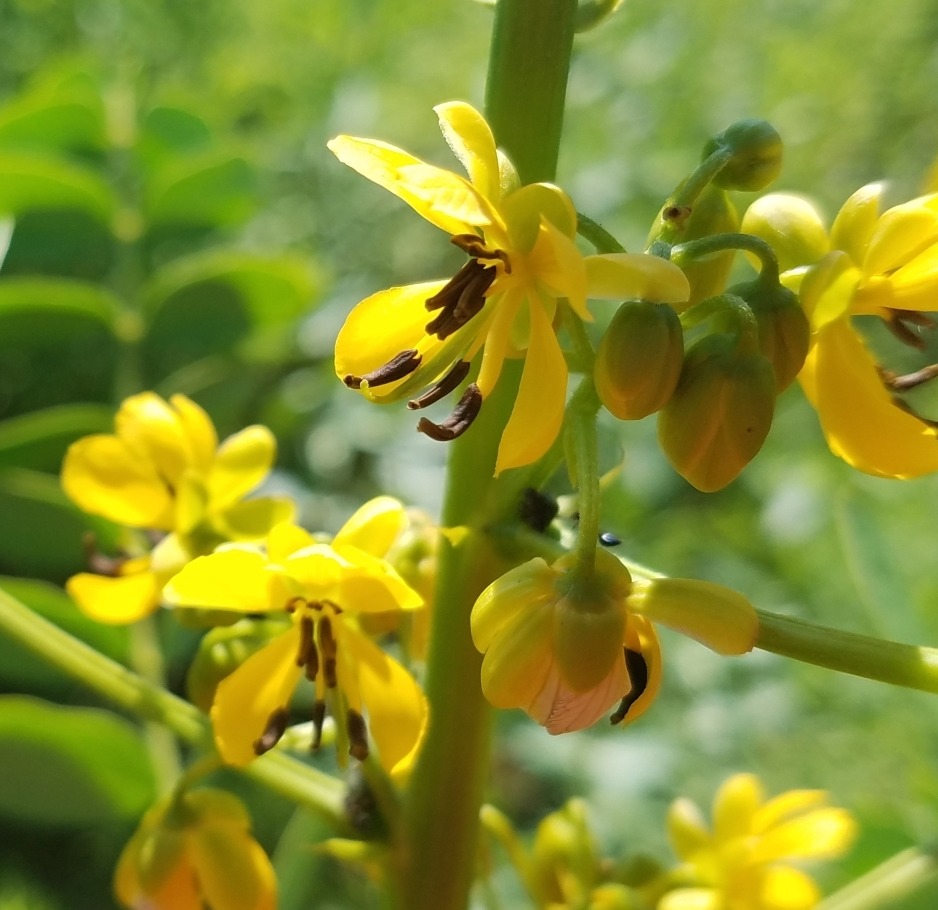
Flowers showing brown anthers and relatively hairless pistils

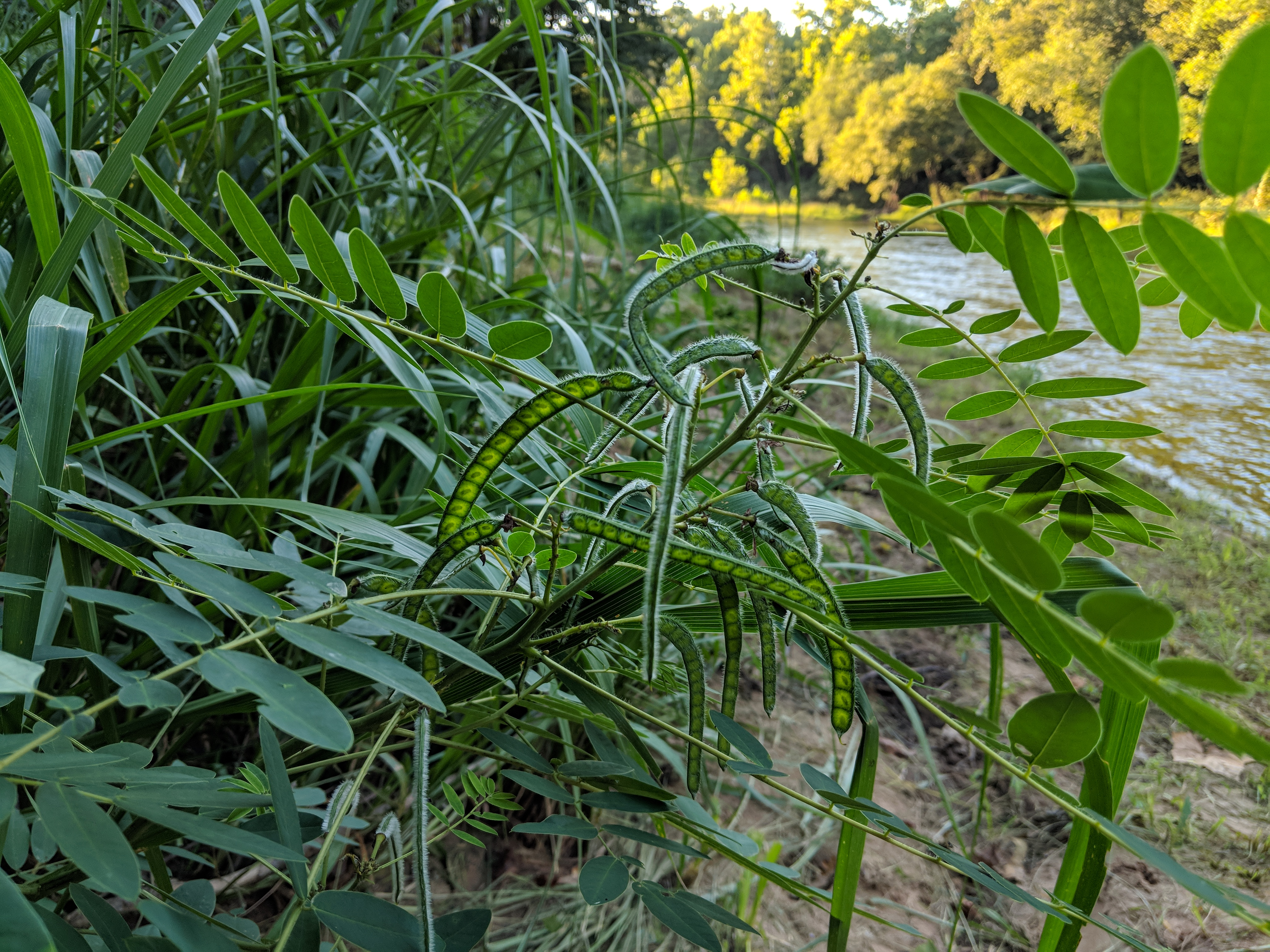
Senna marilandica on the banks of the Cacapon River

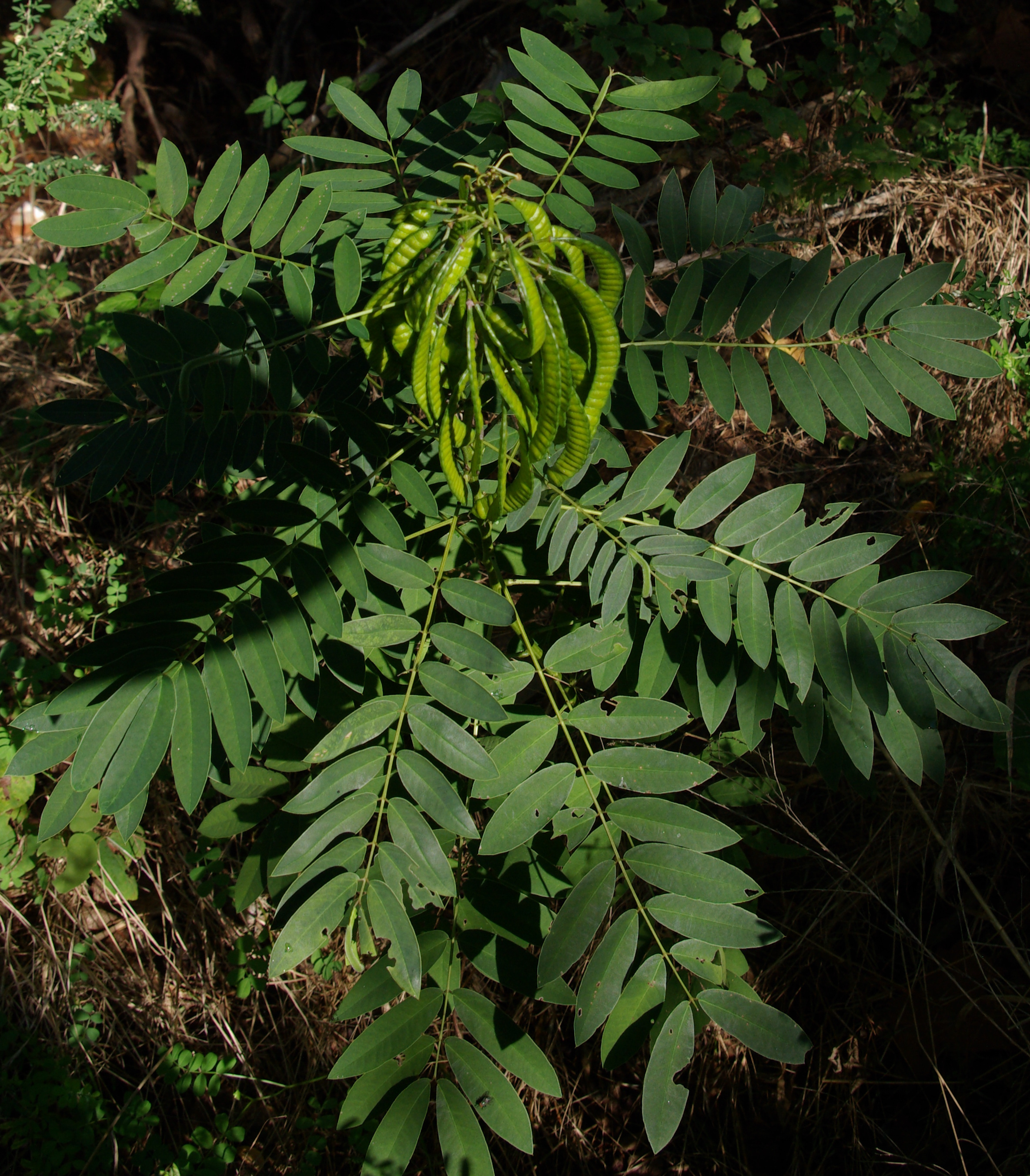
Seed pods of Maryland senna
