= Large dense core vesicles =

Large dense core vesicle (LDCVs) are lipid vesicles in neurons and secretory cells which may be filled with neurotransmitters, such as catecholamines or neuropeptides. LDVCs release their content through SNARE-mediated exocytosis similar to synaptic vesicles. One key difference between synaptic vesicles and LDCVs is that protein synaptophysin which is present in the membrane of synaptic vesicles is absent in LDCVs. LDCVs have an electron dense core which appears as a black circle in micrographs obtained with transmission electron microscopy.
