= Gottfried S. Fraenkel =

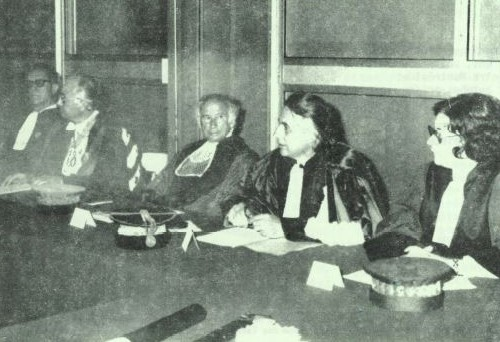
Professor Fraenkel receiving an honorary doctorate on 21 April 1980 from the University of Tours

Gottfried Samuel Fraenkel (April 29, 1901 – October 27, 1984) was a German-born American insect physiologist and a professor of entomology at the University of Illinois. He is considered a founding figure in the field of insect nutrition and endocrinology. He also studied insect behavior and wrote an influential book along with D.L. Gunn, The Orientation of Animals (1940, 1961).

== Biography ==
Fraenkel was born in Munich to a Jewish family. His father was a Justizrat (councillor of justice). He trained to play the piano at home and went to obtain a teaching degree at the Ludwig-Maximilians-Universität München and attended the course of R. C. Hertwig, Karl von Goebel, Richard Willstatter, W. K. Rontgen, and Karl von Frisch. He was interested in aquatic biology and maintained specimens in a tank, but when they all died, he had to visit the Marine Zoological Stations in Naples. He examined jellyfish that had blown into Naples during a storm and hypothesized that medusa statocysts acted as gravity sensors. He then returned to the Ludwig-Maximilians-Universität München and wrote his thesis on the subject under professor Otto Koehler. He received a doctorate in 1925. He spent some time with Alfred Kuhn at the University of Göttingen examining the perception of color by bees. With a Rockefeller grant he also spent time at the Marine Zoological Stations in Naples, Roscoff, and Plymouth. He examined phototaxis and geotaxis in a number of marine organisms. Fraenkel also began to study insect flight, examining the function of halteres in flies, which would later involve a collaboration with J.W.S. Pringle. He also became interested in cutaneous respiration in fly larvae and attempted to prevent air intake by ligation of the anterior end. This however caused developmental faults during metamorphosis, and he was able to determine that the anterior end produced a hormone involved in initiating pupation. Fraenkel later took an interest in insect endocrinology. Brought up under Zionist rhetoric, he went to the Hebrew University of Jerusalem in 1927 as an assistant to F. S. Bodenheimer. Here, he studied migratory locusts during a major invasion in 1929 and wrote on insect migration. He married Lithuania-born sculptor Rachel Sobol during this period. He, however, fell out with Bodenheimer in an authorship-related dispute and returned to Germany, where he worked very briefly as a privatdozent in Frankfurt. With the rise of Hitler, he was dismissed, and he emigrated in 1933 to England where he found work at the University of London with help from Julian Huxley and others. He used a bioassay technique making use of larval ligation to identify a molting prehormone in Calliphora flies which would later be identified as ecdysterone. He published his first paper in English on the topic. He gave lectures in insect physiology in 1935. He was part of a committee of the Fabian Society set up to study agriculture and was involved in determining the nutrient requirement for the British people and standardizing the size, shape, and composition of the British National bread loaf during World War II. During the War, he was involved in examining insect pests of stored food and here he identified cholesterol (and sterols) as a key limiting factor for insect growth. He also found that vitamin B was synthesized by bacteria in the insect gut. He found a new vitamin that insects needed which was later found to be carnitine. He then took an interest in the question of host specificity among phytophagous insects and examined the role of host choice through chemosensory responses. He recognized the evolution of secondary plant substances (which had already been commented on by Ernst Stahl) and their role in attracting insects as well as in defense against insects. In 1946, he was invited to the University of Minnesota by Glenn Richards and in 1948 he received an invitation to join the University of Illinois. In the 1960s, he again became interested in insect endocrinology and was able to identify a hormone involved in controlling insect metamorphosis. He and his students identified the hormone that they called bursicon in 1965. Fraenkel developed several bioassay methods for the study of insect hormones. In 1969, he identified a component that accelerated pupation in blowflies that was present in the nerve tissues of insects. He published more than 200 papers and books. He was elected to the US National Academy of Sciences in 1968. He retired in 1972 but continue to work as an emeritus professor until his death.

Fraenkel had two sons Gideon who became a professor of chemistry and Daniel who became a professor of immunology. In his spare time, Fraenkel pursued his musical interests, playing the piano and cello. Fraenkel published his first book through Dover publishers which was headed by Hayward Cirker (1918-2000) who was also interested in music. Fraenkel had been a keen collector of musical texts between 1940 and 1960. This led to a book titled Pictorial and Decorative Music Title Pages from Music Sources: 201 Examples from 1500-1800 published by Dover in 1968. His collection of about 1300 music texts is now held in the University of Illinois.
