= Proctolin =

Names
- IUPAC name (2S,3R)-2-[[(2S)-1-[(2S)-2-[[(2S)-2-[[(2S)-2-amino-5-(diaminomethylideneamino)pentanoyl]amino]-3-(4-hydroxyphenyl)propanoyl]amino]-4-methylpentanoyl]pyrrolidine-2-carbonyl]amino]-3-hydroxybutanoic acid
- Other names L-Arginyl-L-tyrosyl-L-leucyl-L-prolyl-L-threonine; Arg-Tyr-Leu-Pro-Thr

Identifiers
CAS Number	57966-42-4
3D model (JSmol)	Interactive image
ChEBI	CHEBI:230990
ChEMBL	ChEMBL295536
ChemSpider	110337
PubChem CID	123786
CompTox Dashboard (EPA)	DTXSID80956793
- InChI: InChI=1S/C30H48N8O8/c1-16(2)14-22(28(44)38-13-5-7-23(38)27(43)37-24(17(3)39)29(45)46)36-26(42)21(15-18-8-10-19(40)11-9-18)35-25(41)20(31)6-4-12-34-30(32)33/h8-11,16-17,20-24,39-40H,4-7,12-15,31H2,1-3H3,(H,35,41)(H,36,42)(H,37,43)(H,45,46)(H4,32,33,34)/t17-,20+,21+,22+,23+,24+/m1/s1 Key: KKUPPLMEDQDAJX-UEHMALFGSA-N
- SMILES: C[C@H]([C@@H](C(=O)O)NC(=O)[C@@H]1CCCN1C(=O)[C@H](CC(C)C)NC(=O)[C@H](CC2=CC=C(C=C2)O)NC(=O)[C@H](CCCN=C(N)N)N)O

Properties
Chemical formula	C_{30}H_{48}N_{8}O_{8}
Molar mass	648.762 g·mol^{−1}
- Except where otherwise noted, data are given for materials in their standard state (at 25 °C [77 °F], 100 kPa). Infobox references

Proctolin is a neuropeptide present in insects and crustaceans. It was first found in Periplaneta americana, a species of cockroach in 1975. Proctolin was extracted from 125,000 cockroaches and the Edman degradation was carried out on the sample to determine the amino acid sequence, which is Arg-Tyr-Leu-Pro-Thr.

Proctolin was the first insect neuropeptide to be sequenced. Starratt and Brown identified it as a visceral muscle neurotransmitter. However, it now appears that there are many more functions of proctolin, and it is present in many more species.

== Localisation ==
Proctolin is found in the following insect orders:

- Orthoptera
- Hemiptera
- Diptera
- Coleoptera

Proctolin may also be present in molluscs, annelids, decapod crustaceans, and possibly even some mammals.

== Structure ==
The proctolin structure is very highly conserved between species. Proctolin analogs have been synthesised in order to find out more about the structure of the molecule. It was found that each amino acid in the proctolin molecule was needed for full activity. The preferred conformation of proctolin is a quasi-cyclic structure with the tyrosyl side chain pointing outwards. This is the best position for it to bind to the active site of the receptor.

A large range of proctolin peptide and nonpeptide mimetics have been synthesised to try and produce new effective insecticides.

== Function ==
Proctolin is not considered a classical neurotransmitter as in many systems where it is present it does not change the postsynaptic conductance. It is believed proctolin is a neurohormone in crustaceans and in some insects. More frequently, proctolin is referred to as a neuromodulator. This is because all proctolinergic systems change the way impulses are transmitted across a synapse, using proctolin as a cotransmitter, often with a more common neurotransmitter such as glutamate.

Proctolin is a potent stimulator in the contraction of a number of visceral and skeletal muscles in insects. Proctolin stimulates contractions of the hindgut in P. americana, the foregut in S. gregaria and the midgut of Diploptera punctata and L. migratoria. Proctolin also modulates reproductive tissue, stimulating contractions of the oviducts in P. americana, Leucophaea maderae, L. migratoria, and spermathecae in L. migratoria and Rhodnius prolixus. Another function of proctolin is that it speeds up heart rate in some insects.

A proctolin receptor in Drosophila melanogaster has been recently identified as the orphan G-protein coupled receptor CG6986. The DNA of the gene sequence was cloned and expressed in mammalian cells and the expressed receptor was specific for proctolin. In Drosophila, this receptor is strongly expressed in the head, the larval hindgut, the aorta and on neuronal endings in adult hearts.

== Synthesis and breakdown ==
Through analysis of the Drosophila melanogaster genome, the gene that codes for the proctolin precursor has been identified as CG7105. The pre-proprotein is 140 amino acids long and has cleavage sites either side of the RYLPT proctolin sequence. It is thought a signal peptidase cuts at these cleavage sites to produce the proctolin peptide.

Proctolin needs to be broken down to stop it staying permanently bound to the receptor. This is done by peptidases. The first step of breakdown is cleavage of the Arg-Tyr bond, followed by the cleavage of the Tyr-Leu bond. Using a number of tissue homogenates from Periplaneta americana a soluble aminopeptidase as a key enzyme that degrades proctolin was identified. Another enzyme was also identified that cleaves the Tyr-Leu bond.
