= Powder-puff plant =

Powder-puff plant is a common name for several plants and may refer to:

- Calliandra, genus in the family Fabaceae
- Mimosa strigillosa, perennial ground cover in the family Fabaceae
- Sorocephalus, genus of small shrubs in the family Proteaceae
- Tillandsia tectorum
