= GPR160 =

Protein-coding gene in the species Homo sapiens

Identifiers
- Aliases: GPR160, GPCR1, GPCR150, G protein-coupled receptor 160
- External IDs: MGI: 1919112; GeneCards: GPR160

Gene location (Human)
Chr.	Chromosome 3 (human)
Band	3q26.2	Start	170,037,995 bp
Band	3q26.2	End	170,085,392 bp

Gene location (Mouse)
Chr.	Chromosome 3 (mouse)
Band	3|3 A3	Start	30,910,099 bp
Band	3|3 A3	End	30,951,341 bp
RNA expression pattern
Bgee	Human / Mouse (ortholog); Top expressed in: mucosa of ileum; mucosa of sigmoid colon; rectum; corpus epididymis; duodenum; bone marrow; jejunal mucosa; bone marrow cell; mucosa of transverse colon; trabecular bone / Top expressed in: spermatocyte; spermatid; seminiferous tubule; lens; jejunum; epithelium of lens; right kidney; granulocyte; duodenum; skin of abdomen; More reference expression data
BioGPS	n/a
Gene ontology
Molecular function	G protein-coupled receptor activity; signal transducer activity
Cellular component	integral component of membrane; receptor complex; membrane; plasma membrane
Biological process	G protein-coupled receptor signaling pathway; signal transduction
Sources:Amigo / QuickGO
Orthologs
Databases	NCBI: entry; OMA: entry
Species	Human	Mouse
Entrez	26996	71862
Ensembl	ENSG00000173890	ENSMUSG00000037661
UniProt	Q9UJ42	Q3U3F9
RefSeq (mRNA)	NM_014373	NM_001134385; NM_001134386; NM_001286994; NM_001286995; NM_001286996 NM_027965; NM_001357144
RefSeq (protein)	NP_055188	NP_001127857; NP_001127858; NP_001273923; NP_001273924; NP_001273925 NP_082241; NP_001344073
Location (UCSC)	Chr 3: 170.04 – 170.09 Mb	Chr 3: 30.91 – 30.95 Mb
PubMed search
- Wikidata
View/Edit Human	View/Edit Mouse

Probable G-protein coupled receptor 160 is a protein that in humans is encoded by the GPR160 gene. It has been shown to be important in embryonic stem cell development, is involved in the perception of neuropathic pain, and is present in elevated levels in some cancers. GPR160 has been suggested as the receptor for Cocaine- and amphetamine-regulated transcript, also known as CART. However other research has since shown that it does not appear CART binds to GPR160 directly. This suggests that an as yet unidentified target for CART may modulate GPR160 mediated responses indirectly under certain conditions, but without directly binding to the GPR160 receptor.
