= Neuropeptide =

Peptides released by neurons as intercellular messengers

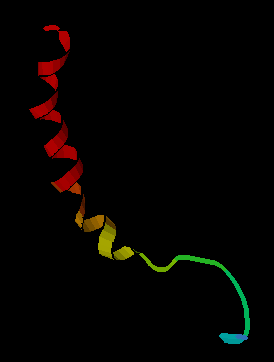
Neuropeptide Y

Neuropeptides are chemical messengers made up of small chains of amino acids that are synthesized and released by neurons. Neuropeptides typically bind to G protein-coupled receptors (GPCRs) to modulate neural activity and other tissues like the gut, muscles, and heart.

Neuropeptides are synthesized from large precursor proteins which are cleaved and post-translationally processed then packaged into large dense core vesicles. Neuropeptides are often co-released with other neuropeptides and neurotransmitters in a single neuron, yielding a multitude of effects. Once released, neuropeptides can diffuse widely to affect a broad range of targets.

Neuropeptides are extremely ancient and highly diverse chemical messengers. Placozoans such as Trichoplax, extremely basal animals which do not possess neurons, use peptides for cell-to-cell communication in a way similar to the neuropeptides of higher animals.

== Examples ==
Peptide signals play a role in information processing that is different from that of conventional neurotransmitters, and many appear to be particularly associated with specific behaviours. For example, in mammals oxytocin and vasopressin have striking and specific effects on social behaviours, including maternal behaviour and pair bonding. In invertebrates, CCAP has several functions including regulating heart rate, allatostatin and proctolin regulate food intake and growth, and bursicon controls tanning of the cuticle.

== Synthesis ==
Neuropeptides are synthesized from inactive precursor proteins called prepropeptides. Prepropeptides contain sequences for a family of distinct peptides and often contain duplicated copies of the same peptides, depending on the organism. In addition to the precursor peptide sequences, prepropeptides also contain a signal peptide, spacer peptides, and cleavage sites. The signal peptide sequence guides the protein to the secretory pathway, starting at the endoplasmic reticulum. The signal peptide sequence is removed in the endoplasmic reticulum, yielding a propeptide. The propeptide travels to the Golgi apparatus where it is proteolytically cleaved and processed into multiple peptides. Peptides are packaged into dense core vesicles, where further cleaving and processing, such as C-terminal amidation, can occur. Dense core vesicles are transported throughout the neuron and can release peptides at the synaptic cleft, cell body, and along the axon.

A single animal may use hundreds of different neuropeptides. In C. elegans, for example, 120 genes specify more than 250 neuropeptides.

== Mechanism ==
Neuropeptides are released by dense core vesicles after depolarization of the cell. Compared to classical neurotransmitter signaling, neuropeptide signaling is more sensitive. Neuropeptide receptor affinity is in the nanomolar to micromolar range while neurotransmitter affinity is in the micromolar to millimolar range. Additionally, dense core vesicles contain a small amount of neuropeptide (3 - 10mM) compared to synaptic vesicles containing neurotransmitters (e.g. 100mM for acetylcholine). Evidence shows that neuropeptides are released after high-frequency firing or bursts, distinguishing dense core vesicle from synaptic vesicle release. Neuropeptides utilize volume transmission and are not reuptaken quickly, allowing diffusion across broad areas (nm to mm) to reach targets. Almost all neuropeptides bind to G protein-coupled receptors (GPCRs), inducing second messenger cascades to modulate neural activity on long time-scales.

Expression of neuropeptides in the nervous system is diverse. Neuropeptides are often co-released with other neuropeptides and neurotransmitters, yielding a diversity of effects depending on the combination of release. For example, vasoactive intestinal peptide is typically co-released with acetylcholine. Neuropeptide release can also be specific. In Drosophila larvae, for example, eclosion hormone is expressed in just two neurons.

=== Co-release ===
Neuropeptides are often co-released with other neurotransmitters and neuropeptides to modulate synaptic activity. Synaptic vesicles and dense core vesicles can have differential activation properties for release, resulting in context-dependent co-release combinations. For example, insect motor neurons are glutamatergic and some contain dense core vesicles with proctolin. At low frequency activation, only glutamate is released, yielding fast and rapid excitation of the muscle. At high frequency activation however, dense core vesicles release proctolin, inducing prolonged contractions. Thus, neuropeptide release can be fine-tuned to modulate synaptic activity in certain contexts.

Some regions of the nervous system are specialized to release distinctive sets of peptides. For example, the hypothalamus and the pituitary gland release peptides (e.g. TRH, GnRH, CRH, SST) that act as hormones In one subpopulation of the arcuate nucleus of the hypothalamus, three anorectic peptides are co-expressed: α-melanocyte-stimulating hormone (α-MSH), galanin-like peptide, and cocaine-and-amphetamine-regulated transcript (CART), and in another subpopulation two orexigenic peptides are co-expressed, neuropeptide Y and agouti-related peptide (AGRP). These peptides are all released in different combinations to signal hunger and satiation cues.

The following is a list of neuroactive peptides co-released with other neurotransmitters. Transmitter names are shown in bold.

Norepinephrine (noradrenaline). In neurons of the A2 cell group in the nucleus of the solitary tract), norepinephrine co-exists with:

- Galanin
- Enkephalin
- Neuropeptide Y

GABA

- Somatostatin (in the hippocampus)
- Cholecystokinin
- Neuropeptide Y (in the arcuate nucleus)

Acetylcholine

- VIP
- Substance P

Dopamine

- Cholecystokinin
- Neurotensin
- Glucagon-like peptide-1 (in the nucleus accumbens)

Epinephrine (adrenaline)

- Neuropeptide Y
- Neurotensin

Serotonin (5-HT)

- Substance P
- TRH
- Enkephalin

Some neurons make several different peptides. For instance, vasopressin co-exists with dynorphin and galanin in magnocellular neurons of the supraoptic nucleus and paraventricular nucleus, and with CRF (in parvocellular neurons of the paraventricular nucleus)

Oxytocin in the supraoptic nucleus co-exists with enkephalin, dynorphin, cocaine-and amphetamine regulated transcript (CART) and cholecystokinin.

== Receptor targets ==
Most neuropeptides act on G-protein coupled receptors (GPCRs). Neuropeptide-GPCRs fall into two families: rhodopsin-like and the secretin class. Most peptides activate a single GPCR, while some activate multiple GPCRs (e.g. AstA, AstC, DTK). Peptide-GPCR binding relationships are highly conserved across animals. Aside from conserved structural relationships, some peptide-GPCR functions are also conserved across the animal kingdom. For example, neuropeptide F/neuropeptide Y signaling is structurally and functionally conserved between insects and mammals.

Although peptides mostly target metabotropic receptors, there is some evidence that neuropeptides bind to other receptor targets. Peptide-gated ion channels (FMRFamide-gated sodium channels) have been found in snails and Hydra. Other examples of non-GPCR targets include: insulin-like peptides and tyrosine-kinase receptors in Drosophila and atrial natriuretic peptide and eclosion hormone with membrane-bound guanylyl cyclase receptors in mammals and insects.

== Actions ==
Due to their modulatory and diffusive nature, neuropeptides can act on multiple time and spatial scales. A nearly complete map of these interactions is known for at least one small animal, C. elegans.

For many other animals, at least some neuropeptide actions are known, as shown in the Examples section above.

== Evolution of neuropeptide signaling ==
Peptides are ancient signaling systems that are found in almost all animals on Earth. Genome sequencing reveals evidence of neuropeptide genes in Cnidaria, Ctenophora, and Placozoa, some of the oldest living animals with nervous systems or neural-like tissues. Recent studies also show genomic evidence of neuropeptide processing machinery in metazoans and choanoflagellates, suggesting that neuropeptide signaling may predate the development of nervous tissues. Additionally, Ctenophore and Placozoa neural signaling is entirely peptidergic and lacks the major amine neurotransmitters such as acetylcholine, dopamine, and serotonin. This also suggests that neuropeptide signaling developed before amine neurotransmitters.

== Applications ==
Neuropeptides and antagonists that bind to their receptors can be used as insecticides. These include both naturally occurring neuropeptides and synthetic compounds designed to block their receptors.

In humans, neuropeptides have been implicated in several human diseases. Antagonists to the related receptors may have clinical application.

== Research history ==
In the early 1900s, chemical messengers were crudely extracted from whole animal brains and tissues and studied for their physiological effects. In 1931, von Euler and Gaddum, used a similar method to try and isolate acetylcholine but instead discovered a peptide substance that induced physiological changes including muscle contractions and depressed blood pressure. These effects were not abolished using atropine, ruling out the substance as acetylcholine.

In insects, proctolin was the first neuropeptide to be isolated and sequenced. In 1975, Alvin Starratt and Brian Brown extracted the peptide from hindgut muscles of the cockroach and found that its application enhanced muscle contractions. While Starratt and Brown initially thought of proctolin as an excitatory neurotransmitter, proctolin was later confirmed as a neuromodulatory peptide.

David de Wied first used the term "neuropeptide" in the 1970s to delineate peptides derived from the nervous system.
