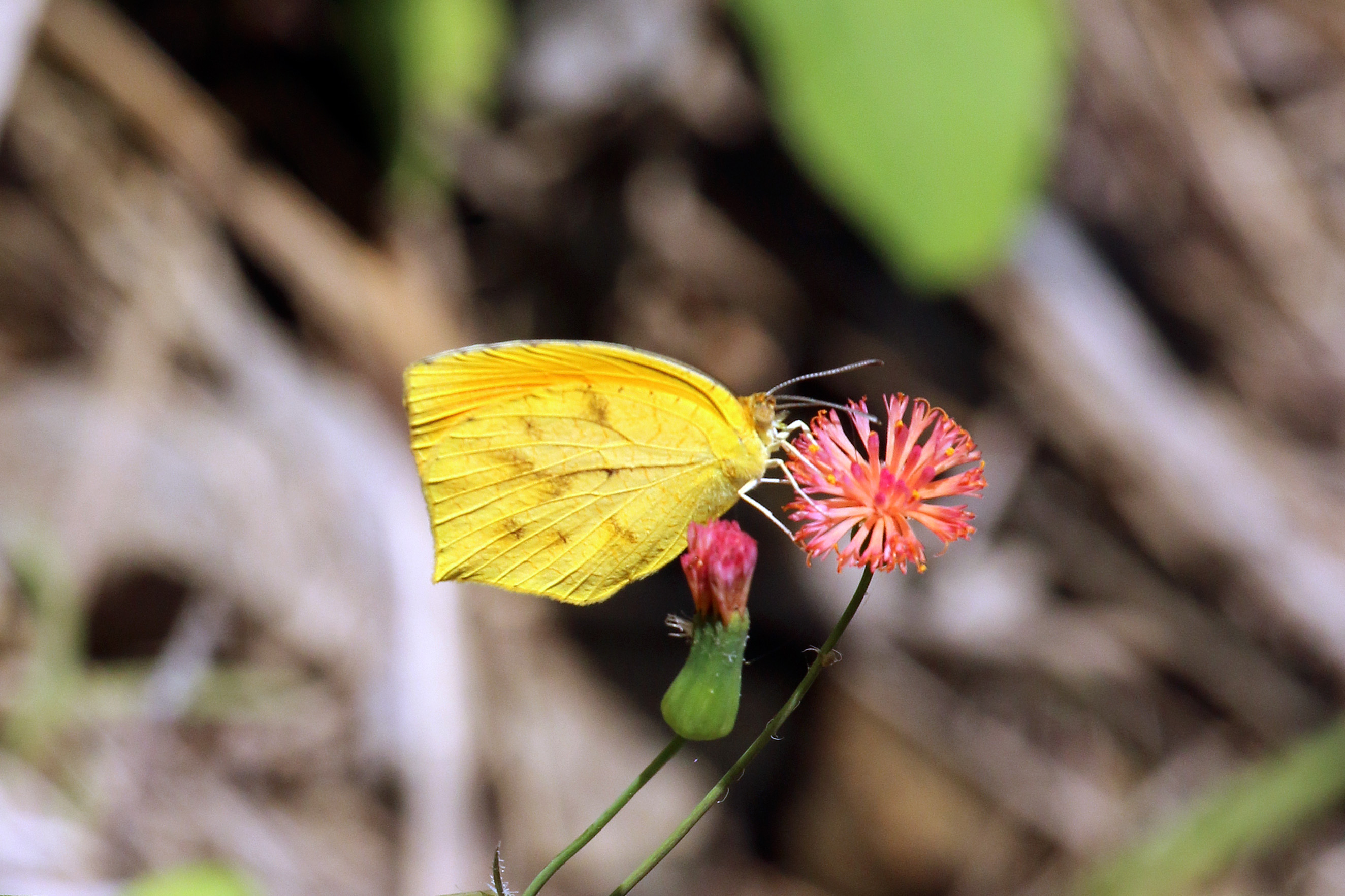
- In Jamaica

Conservation status
- Secure (NatureServe)

Scientific classification
- Kingdom: Animalia
- Phylum: Arthropoda
- Clade: Pancrustacea
- Class: Insecta
- Order: Lepidoptera
- Family: Pieridae
- Genus: Eurema
- Species: E. proterpia

Binomial name
- Eurema proterpia (Fabricius, 1775)

Synonyms
- Papilio proterpia Fabricius, 1775; Pyrisitia proterpia; Terias proterpia; Terias gundlachia Poey, 1851; Terias longicauda Bates, 1864; Eurema longicauda; Eurema proterpia watsonia Klots, 1923; Eurema gundlachia morleyi Coxeý, 1932; Terias proterpia ab. imitatrix d'Almeida, 1932; Papilio atzin Arias, 1968 (nom. nud.)

= Eurema proterpia =

Species of butterfly

Eurema proterpia, the tailed orange, is a North and South American butterfly in the family Pieridae.

== Description ==
The upperside of the wings is orange with a variable amount of black along the forewing costa. The wing veins are lightly marked with black in summer individuals, and winter individuals have no black veins. Males reflect UV light on their upper sides, and some females can be white. The underside of the wings varies depending on the season. Summer individuals are yellow orange with the hindwing slightly pointed. Winter individuals are brown with darker brown markings with the hindwing being much more pointed. The wingspan measures 1 1/4 to 1 3/4 inches (32–44 mm).

== Similar species ==
The only similar species in the tailed orange's range is the sleepy orange (Eurema nicippe).

The sleepy orange has a black forewing cell spot on the upperside, the upperside of the hindwing has a black marginal border, and the hindwing is not pointed.

== Habitat ==
The tailed orange lives in a variety of open habitats such as open woodlands, deserts and subtropical habitats.

== Flight ==
This species may be found from mid-July to early January in Arizona, from August to November in Texas, and all year round in Mexico.

== Life cycle ==
Males patrol all day in search of females. The larva is bright yellow green with a yellow lateral stripe.

== Host plants ==
Host plants of the tailed orange include:

- Cassia texana
- Chamaecrista species
- Desmodium species
- Prosopis reptans
- Senna chamaecrista
