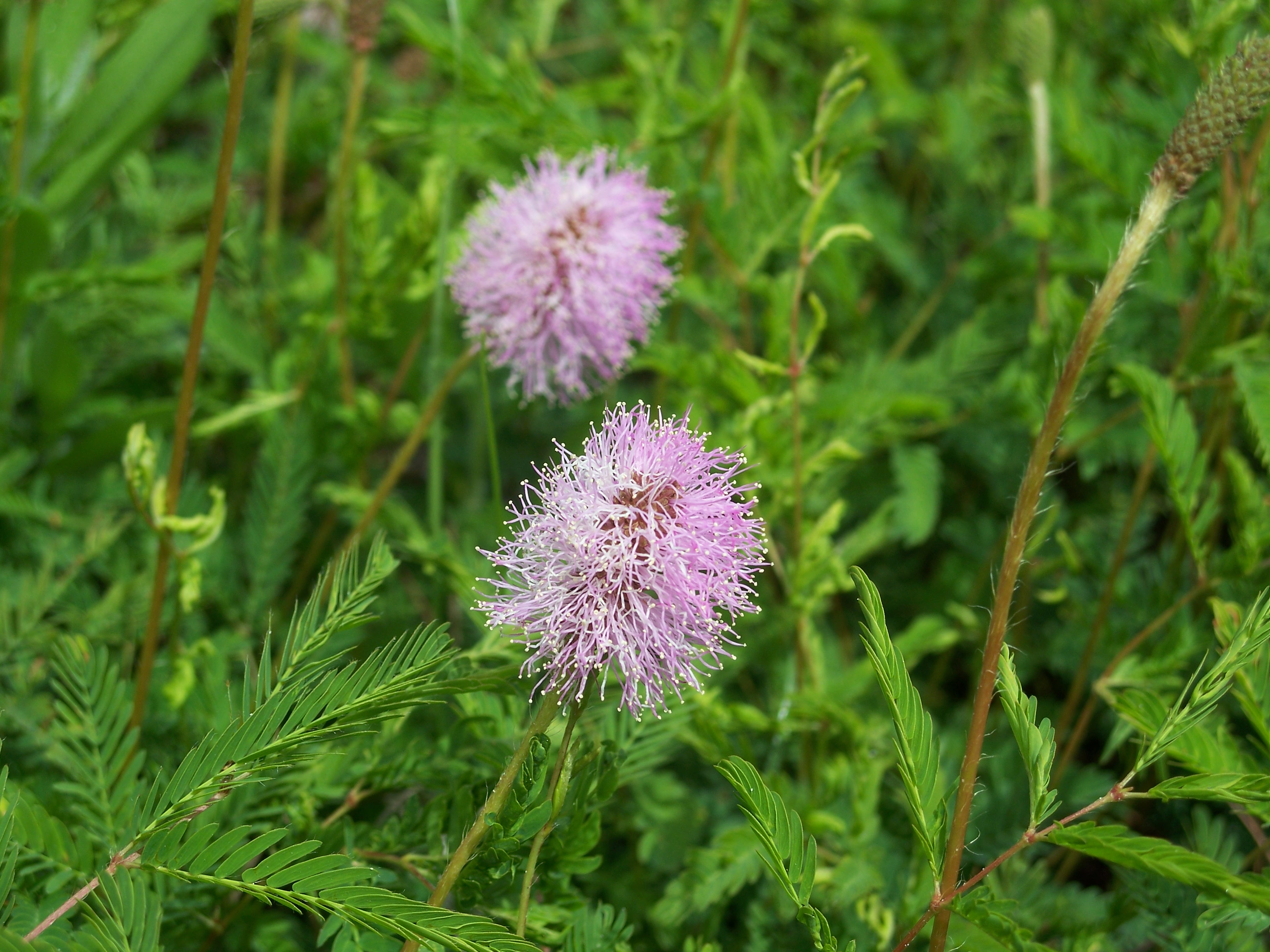

Conservation status
- Apparently Secure (NatureServe)

Scientific classification
- Kingdom: Plantae
- Clade: Tracheophytes
- Clade: Angiosperms
- Clade: Eudicots
- Clade: Rosids
- Order: Fabales
- Family: Fabaceae
- Subfamily: Caesalpinioideae
- Clade: Mimosoid clade
- Genus: Mimosa
- Species: M. strigillosa

Binomial name
- Mimosa strigillosa Torr. & A.Gray

= Mimosa strigillosa =

Species of legume

Mimosa strigillosa, also known as sunshine mimosa and powderpuff, is a perennial ground cover in the family Fabaceae that is native to nearly all US states bordering the Gulf of Mexico and grows north into Georgia and Arkansas as well. The name powderpuff refers to the small spherical flowers that rise above the plant's creeping vines. Like related species in the genus Mimosa, sunshine mimosa has sensitive leaves that can fold in a matter of seconds after being disturbed.

Because of sunshine mimosa's mat forming nature, drought tolerance, and because like many legumes it is capable of nitrogen fixation and thus doesn't need fertilizer it has become recommended as a replacement for turf grasses for the purposes of xeriscaping and lowering environmental impact. The plant is also recommended as a turfgrass replacement because of its ability to withstand some foot traffic and mowing, It is capable of spreading rapidly and as few as four or five pots may cover 300 square feet in a single growing season. Some may find it problematic that the plant is a host for the larva of little sulphur (Eurema lisa) butterflies. Because of sunshine mimosa's general usefulness as a landscaping plant it was named one of the 2008 plants of the year by the Florida Nursery, Growers & Landscape Association.
