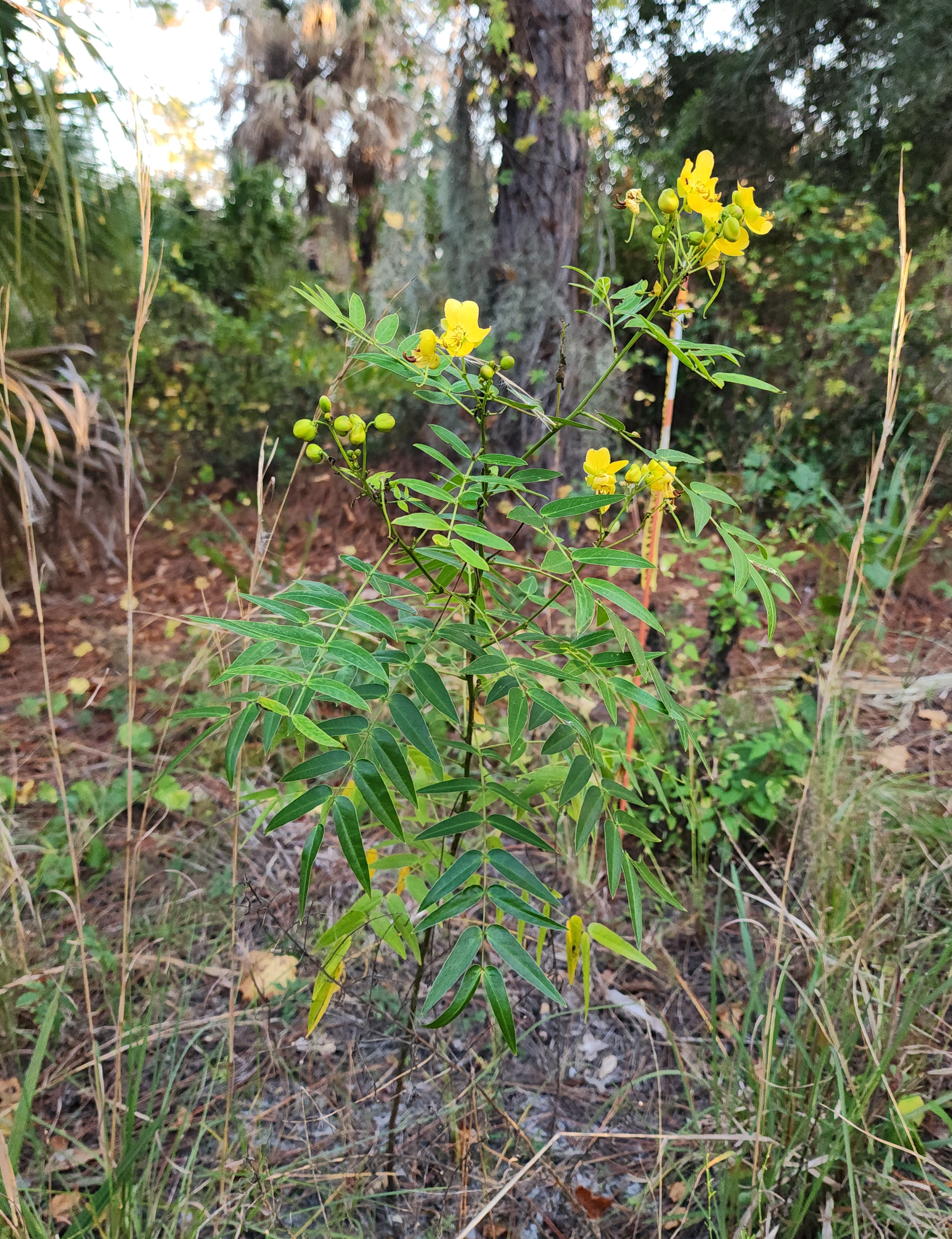
- Blooming in degraded mixed hammock-flatwood habitat

Conservation status
- Secure (NatureServe)

Scientific classification
- Kingdom: Plantae
- Clade: Tracheophytes
- Clade: Angiosperms
- Clade: Eudicots
- Clade: Rosids
- Order: Fabales
- Family: Fabaceae
- Subfamily: Caesalpinioideae
- Genus: Senna
- Species: S. ligustrina

Binomial name
- Senna ligustrina (L.)H.S.Irwin & Barneby

= Senna ligustrina =

Species of flowering plant

Senna ligustrina, commonly referred to as privet wild sensitive plant or privet senna, is a species of flowering plant native to the Antilles and the US state of Florida.

== Habitat ==
It's natively found in hardwood hammocks but can also act as a ruderal species, recolonizing hydric disturbed habitats.
