= Rhode Island Works =

Financial and employment service program in Rhode Island, USA

Rhode Island Works is a program intended to provide financial and employment services for needy families in order to give children a healthy growth. The program was intended to provide families of low income the necessary aids such as food, shelter, clothing, child care, and medical care as well as assisting parents in finding employment. Applicants for the program are eligible if they are living in the state of Rhode of Island and also if they meet the Department of Human Services eligibility requirements that are set forth.

== Background ==
Rhode Island Works was introduced in 2008 as a means to provide aid to low-income families who are struggling to find jobs and the proper amenities for their children. It replaced the former program known as the Family Independence Program (FIP) which was created in 1996. The program came to be after each states were provided a block grant under the federal Temporary Assistance for Needy Families or TANF. The grants from TANF allowed each state to use the money in their own program to help the low income families within their state base on needs of the people. Unlike the previous program FIP, RI works became more restrictive in the new changes it implemented such as limiting the amount of time family remains in the program from 60 months to 48 months. The cash assistance that is used to help low income families are controlled at the state level. They are to decide the amount of money that is needed to give to a family that has no income and after the level of cash assistance is set for each level. The states also have to decide the earning disregard and the benefit reduction rate. Earning disregard is how much a family can make and continue to keep the benefit and the benefit reduction rate is the level in which benefits are reduced and the earning increased above the earning disregard. The states are free to set the benefit levels and make adjustments that they see fit their state welfare program.

== Eligibility requirements ==
In order to be accepted into the program there are many qualifications that are required for a family to meet: The family must have a child or a pregnancy that requires dependency. There is also an income limit in which the family must meet as well as the asset limits. An applicant must also be a U.S. Citizens or an eligible non-citizen. When it comes to the cash assistance, the amount of money each family receives depends on the incomes, household size, and the living condition the family is in. In a two parent household, either one or both of the parents must work a combined of at least 35 hours a week.

The program also allows minors under the age of 18 who are parents or pregnant to receive cash assistance. When it comes to minors who are parents, they must live at home with their parent or legal guardian. If they are unable to live with a parent or legal guardian, their living arrangements must be approved and monitored by the Youth Success Program. The cash assistance will be given to the minor parent through their parent, legal guardian or whom ever is their primary care provider. While receiving the cash assistance, the minor parents must enroll in secondary education in order to continue receiving money from the program.

=== Time limit ===
After July 1, 2008, all applicants that were applying for cash assistance were limited to 24 months out of any 60-month period for a lifetime limit of 48 months. A family may continue to receive cash assistance after the time limit if they are able to provide proof of hardship. The Department of Human Services can only continue to provide cash assistance after the time limit if exempted families who claim hardship does not exceed 20% of the average monthly number of families that need assistance in a fiscal year.

Rhode Island is not the only state that has a low time limit policies. In fact, many states have changed the time limit on their version of the TANF program. For example, the state of Arizona reduced their TANF time limit to 24 months. This resulted in the benefits of over 3,500 low-income families to end and many other families will find that their benefit are slowly getting cut as they get closer to the 24 months time period. Even in the state of Maine where their program had no time limit as long as the families were working or are involved in work related activities, enacted a 60-month time limit policy.

== Effect of the program ==
It has been reported that over 4,100 families receive the RI Works benefit and they live in almost every city in Rhode Island. Besides the family about 7,200 children and 2,400 adults also receive the benefits that the program has to offer. In about one-third of families, the children are the ones receiving the assistance because their parents are disable. Officials of Rhode Island are working to repeal the 24 month time limit because of the belief that it is not enough time for the parents to gain skills needed to retain a job. They are also looking to improve the program by allowing parents to receive 2 years of education at the Community College of Rhode Island to further their training and education.

In the health care field, there are some disagreement on whether the program help participants retain their job. When training welfare recipients in health care occupations, it does not assure that they will partake in the sector. It does not take away from people's dissatisfaction in the job such as the emotional investments and lack of competitive wages. For people who feel they are compensated unfairly, they may be unwilling to continue with the job. Instead, dissatisfaction will lead to higher turnover rates in the job.
