= Galanin receptor 3 =

Protein-coding gene in the species Homo sapiens

GALR3

Identifiers
- Aliases: GALR3, Galanin receptor 3
- External IDs: OMIM: 603692; MGI: 1329003; GeneCards: GALR3

Gene location (Human)
| Chr. | Chromosome 22 (human) |
| Band | 22q13.1 | Start | 37,823,382 bp |
| Band | 22q13.1 | End | 37,825,485 bp |

Gene location (Mouse)
| Chr. | Chromosome 15 (mouse) |
| Band | 15 E1|15 37.7 cM | Start | 78,926,085 bp |
| Band | 15 E1|15 37.7 cM | End | 78,927,758 bp |
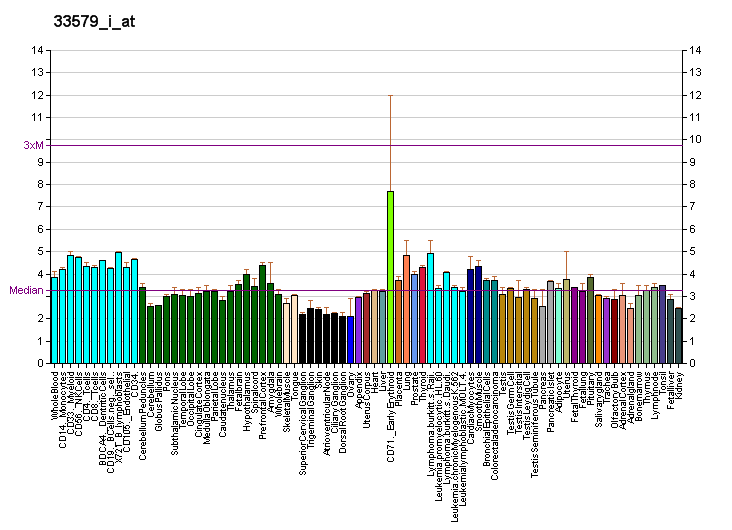
RNA expression pattern
| Bgee | Human / Mouse (ortholog); Top expressed in: cerebellar hemisphere; right hemisphere of cerebellum; nucleus accumbens; skeletal muscle tissue; right lobe of liver; body of pancreas; putamen; amygdala; hypothalamus; muscle of thigh / Top expressed in: CA3 field; intestinal villus; Ileal epithelium; embryo; lactiferous gland; yolk sac; tracheobronchial tree; inferior colliculi; skin of abdomen; islet of Langerhans; More reference expression data |
| BioGPS | More reference expression data |
Gene ontology
| Molecular function | galanin receptor activity; G protein-coupled receptor activity; signal transducer activity; peptide hormone binding; G protein-coupled peptide receptor activity |
| Cellular component | integral component of membrane; plasma membrane; integral component of plasma membrane; membrane; non-motile cilium; cilium |
| Biological process | learning or memory; phospholipase C-activating G protein-coupled receptor signaling pathway; neuropeptide signaling pathway; feeding behavior; positive regulation of transcription by RNA polymerase II; signal transduction; adenylate cyclase-modulating G protein-coupled receptor signaling pathway; chemical synaptic transmission; G protein-coupled receptor signaling pathway; G protein-coupled receptor signaling pathway, coupled to cyclic nucleotide second messenger; negative regulation of adenylate cyclase activity; galanin-activated signaling pathway |
Sources:Amigo / QuickGO
Orthologs
| Databases | NCBI: entry; OMA: entry |
| Species | Human | Mouse |
| Entrez | 8484 | 14429 |
| Ensembl | ENSG00000128310 | ENSMUSG00000114755 |
| UniProt | O60755 | O88853 |
| RefSeq (mRNA) | NM_003614 | NM_015738 |
| RefSeq (protein) | NP_003605 | NP_056553 |
| Location (UCSC) | Chr 22: 37.82 – 37.83 Mb | Chr 15: 78.93 – 78.93 Mb |
| PubMed search |
- Wikidata
| View/Edit Human | View/Edit Mouse |

Galanin receptor 3 (GAL_{3}) is a G-protein coupled receptor encoded by the GALR3 gene.

== Function ==
The neuropeptide galanin modulates a variety of physiologic processes including cognition/memory, sensory/pain processing, hormone secretion, and feeding behavior. The human galanin receptors are G protein-coupled receptors that functionally couple to their intracellular effector through distinct signaling pathways. GALR3 is found in many tissues and may be expressed as 1.4-, 2.4-, and 5-kb transcripts

== See also ==
- Galanin receptor
