= Insect diuretic hormones =

Insect diuretic hormones are hormones that regulate water balance through diuretic action.

The insect excretory system, responsible for regulating water balance in the insect, comprises the Malpighian tubules and the hindgut (the ileum and rectum). Malpighian tubules secrete primary urine, most of which is passed into the hindgut where water, ions and essential metabolites are reabsorbed before the fluid is excreted. Excretion is under the control of diuretic and anti-diuretic factors, or hormones.

These factors are produced in neurosecretory cells in the insect nervous system, and stored and released from neurohaemal sites, such as the corpora cardiaca in the brain. Before a factor can be attributed with the role of hormone, it needs to meet certain criteria. While there is evidence that some diuretic and antidiuretic factors are indeed circulating neurohormones, this has not been demonstrated for all factors investigated so far.

It has been known for many years that insects possess diuretic and antidiuretic factors, but it has only been comparatively recently that technological advances have allowed for them to be characterised. Antidiuretic factors are less well studied than diuretic factors. They act either on the Malpighian tubules to inhibit urine production, or on the hindgut to stimulate reabsorption. To date, the only insect for which both diuretic and antidiuretic hormones (acting directly on tubules) have been isolated is a beetle, the mealworm Tenebrio molitor (Tenebrionidae).

== Function ==
Functions of diuretic and antidiuretic hormones include: postprandial diuresis, post-eclosion diuresis, excretion of excess metabolic water, clearance of toxic wastes and restricting metabolite loss.

The rectal or cryptonephric complex is a structure in which the terminal parts of the Malpighian tubules are closely associated with the rectum. It withdraws water from the rectal contents, thereby limiting fecal water loss, and is even capable of withdrawing water from unsaturated air. The complex is only present in lepidopteran larvae and some beetle species. Little is known about the hormonal control of fluid uptake by the cryptonephric complex, which is certain to play an important role in the species in which it occurs.

== Types ==
There are three main families of diuretic hormones: the corticotropin-releasing factor (CRF)-related peptides, calcitonin (CT)-like peptides and the insect kinins. These will be reviewed briefly. Others have been identified, but will not be discussed here.

CRF-related peptides are the best characterised and have been isolated from Blattodea, Isoptera, Orthoptera, Coleoptera, Diptera and Lepidoptera. Insect CRF-related peptides are so-called because of their similarity to the CRF-related peptides of vertebrates, which indicates a long evolutionary history. They range from 30 to 47 amino acid residues in length. Although only a few orders are represented so far, CRF-related peptides are suspected to be ubiquitous in insects. They act by increasing cyclic AMP production in Malpighian tubules and appear to stimulate cation (K^{+}/Na^{+}) transport.

Originally known as the myokinins because of their myotropic activity, the kinins were first isolated from the Madeira cockroach, Leucophaea maderae and the cricket, Acheta domesticus. Kinins are smaller than the CRF-related peptides (typically 6–15 residues long). They appear to have a non-selective effect on sodium chloride and potassium chloride secretion in tubules by opening a Ca^{2+}-activated anion conductance, thus allowing more Cl^{−} into the tubule. With the increase in available Cl^{−}, additional Na^{+} and K^{+} can be transported into the lumen. Their effects are mimicked by the pharmacological agent, thapsigargin, which is sometimes used in fluid secretion assays when a kinin is not available. Kinins are known from Blattodea, Orthoptera, Lepidoptera and Diptera.

Comparatively recently, a peptide was isolated from the cockroach Diploptera punctata that showed no similarity to any known insect peptide but did show some similarity to vertebrate calcitonin. The D. punctata peptide, subsequently named Dippu-DH31, turned out to be the first example of a whole new family of insect diuretic peptides – the calcitonin (CT)-like peptides. Dippu-DH31 was isolated using a cyclic AMP assay at the same time as a CRF-related peptide from the same insect. Ct-like peptides and CRF-related peptides both stimulate cAMP production by isolated tubules, but it is suspected that CT-like peptides target a different cAMP-dependent effector system or activate a different second messenger pathway. CT-like peptides have since been identified in other orders – Diptera, Lepidoptera, and one has been partially sequenced from Hymenoptera. Unpublished studies show immunologically related peptides in Tenebrio molitor.

It appears that all insects possess diuretic factors from two or more families, indicating that fluid balance is very finely controlled. Synergism between the different factors has been demonstrated in a number of species. However, although it is common, it should not be assumed to be universal. Also, in many cases, it is only the effects on fluid secretion that are measured, and while two factors may both increase fluid secretion, their effects on ion transport may be very different. Further studies examining the composition of the secreted fluid and electrophysiological experiments that explore ion movement, will shed more light on the actual physiological function of these factors in vivo.

For example, in vivo experiments have demonstrated that the fluid secreted by the Malpighian tubules of the desert beetle, Onymacris plana is directed to the midgut for recycling to the haemolymph. In this way, metabolic wastes are rapidly cleared from the haemolymph without an associated loss of water, indicating that diuretic hormones may not always effect diuresis per se.

== Research ==
The effects of diuretic factors are tested in fluid secretion experiments, usually conducted using the Ramsay assay, in which isolated Malpighian tubules are placed in droplets of saline solution under liquid paraffin. The ends of the tubules are drawn out of the saline and wrapped around minuten pins. The diameter of the secreted droplets is measured, whereby the volume, in nanolitres, and hence rate of secretion, can be calculated. Test substances are added to the saline and changes in secretion rate are recorded. Isolated tubules continue to secrete for many hours, and because the Ramsay assay is fairly easy to perform, many peptides are tested using this method. As a result, the effects of diuretic peptides are often tested only on the tubules and their role in other parts of the insect excretory system is not investigated.

== Nomenclature ==
First three letters of genus added to first two letters of the species name. For example, a 37-residue diuretic peptide from Tenebrio molitor will be named Tenmo-DH37.
