= Galanin receptor 2 =

Protein-coding gene in the species Homo sapiens

GALR2

Identifiers
- Aliases: GALR2, GAL2-R, GALNR2, GALR-2, Galanin receptor 2
- External IDs: OMIM: 603691; MGI: 1337018; GeneCards: GALR2

Gene location (Human)
Chr.	Chromosome 17 (human)
Band	17q25.1	Start	76,074,781 bp
Band	17q25.1	End	76,077,537 bp

Gene location (Mouse)
Chr.	Chromosome 11 (mouse)
Band	11 E2|11 81.1 cM	Start	116,171,765 bp
Band	11 E2|11 81.1 cM	End	116,174,764 bp
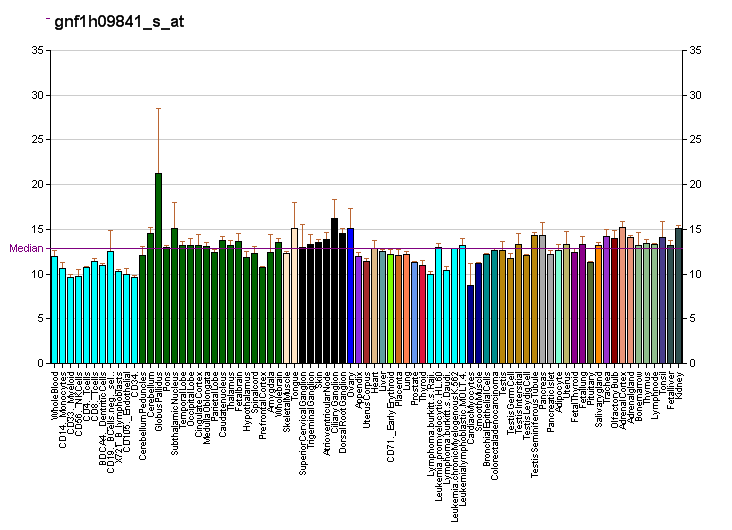

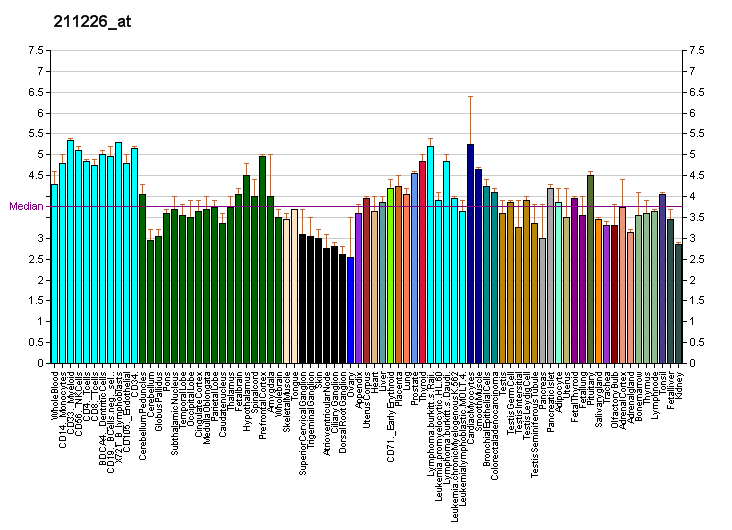
RNA expression pattern
Bgee	Human / Mouse (ortholog); Top expressed in: muscle layer of sigmoid colon; transverse colon; smooth muscle tissue; granulocyte; monocyte; bone marrow; hypothalamus; small intestine; appendix; gastric mucosa / Top expressed in: embryo; embryo; morula; calvaria; skin of external ear; lip; body of femur; dentate gyrus of hippocampal formation granule cell; ileum; gastrula; More reference expression data
BioGPS	More reference expression data
Gene ontology
Molecular function	G protein-coupled receptor activity; neuropeptide binding; signal transducer activity; galanin receptor activity; protein binding; peptide hormone binding; G protein-coupled peptide receptor activity
Cellular component	integral component of membrane; membrane; plasma membrane; integral component of plasma membrane; intracellular anatomical structure; cilium
Biological process	negative regulation of adenylate cyclase activity; muscle contraction; adenylate cyclase-activating G protein-coupled receptor signaling pathway; phosphatidylinositol metabolic process; positive regulation of large conductance calcium-activated potassium channel activity; adenylate cyclase-modulating G protein-coupled receptor signaling pathway; positive regulation of cytosolic calcium ion concentration; inositol phosphate metabolic process; multicellular organism development; cell surface receptor signaling pathway; feeding behavior; learning or memory; neuron projection development; positive regulation of transcription by RNA polymerase II; signal transduction; G protein-coupled receptor signaling pathway; phospholipase C-activating G protein-coupled receptor signaling pathway; galanin-activated signaling pathway; neuropeptide signaling pathway
Sources:Amigo / QuickGO
Orthologs
Databases	NCBI: entry; OMA: entry
Species	Human	Mouse
Entrez	8811	14428
Ensembl	ENSG00000182687	ENSMUSG00000020793
UniProt	O43603	O88854
RefSeq (mRNA)	NM_003857	NM_010254
RefSeq (protein)	NP_003848	NP_034384
Location (UCSC)	Chr 17: 76.07 – 76.08 Mb	Chr 11: 116.17 – 116.17 Mb
PubMed search
- Wikidata
View/Edit Human	View/Edit Mouse

Galanin receptor 2, (GAL_{2}) is a G-protein coupled receptor encoded by the GALR2 gene.

== Function ==
Galanin is an important neuromodulator present in the brain, gastrointestinal system, and hypothalamopituitary axis. It is a 30-amino acid non-C-terminally amidated peptide that potently stimulates growth hormone secretion, inhibits cardiac vagal slowing of heart rate, abolishes sinus arrhythmia, and inhibits postprandial gastrointestinal motility. The actions of galanin are mediated through interaction with specific membrane receptors that are members of the 7-transmembrane family of G protein-coupled receptors. GALR2 interacts with the N-terminal residues of the galanin peptide. The primary signaling mechanism for GALR2 is through the phospholipase C/protein kinase C pathway (via Gq), in contrast to GALR1, which communicates its intracellular signal by inhibition of adenylyl cyclase through Gi. However, it has been demonstrated that GALR2 couples efficiently to both the Gq and Gi proteins to simultaneously activate 2 independent signal transduction pathways.

== See also ==
- Galanin receptor
