= Galanin receptor 1 =

Protein-coding gene in the species Homo sapiens

GALR1

Identifiers
- Aliases: GALR1, GALNR, GALNR1, Galanin receptor 1
- External IDs: OMIM: 600377; MGI: 1096364; GeneCards: GALR1

Gene location (Human)
Chr.	Chromosome 18 (human)
Band	18q23	Start	77,249,848 bp
Band	18q23	End	77,277,900 bp

Gene location (Mouse)
Chr.	Chromosome 18 (mouse)
Band	18 E3|18 55.78 cM	Start	82,410,505 bp
Band	18 E3|18 55.78 cM	End	82,424,902 bp
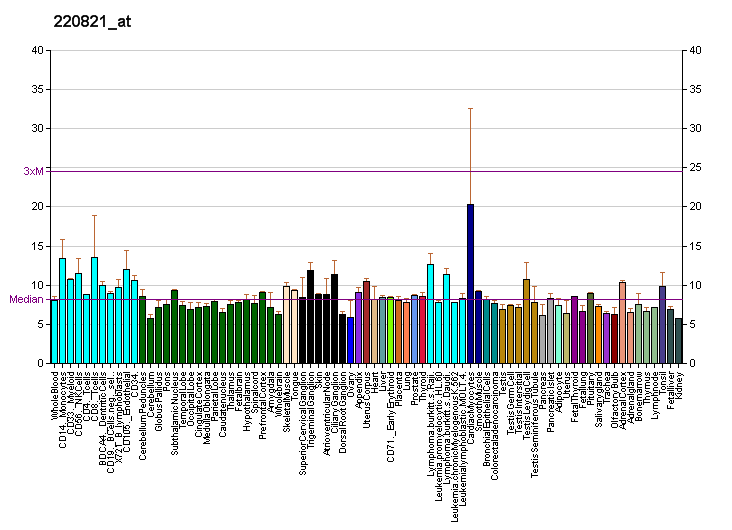
RNA expression pattern
Bgee	Human / Mouse (ortholog); Top expressed in: pituitary gland; anterior pituitary; prefrontal cortex; hypothalamus; corpus callosum; amygdala; right uterine tube; primary visual cortex; dorsolateral prefrontal cortex; rectum / Top expressed in: lumbar spinal ganglion; islet of Langerhans; posterior horn of spinal cord; trigeminal nerve; supraoptic nucleus; paraventricular nucleus of hypothalamus; neural tube; dorsomedial hypothalamic nucleus; dentate gyrus of hippocampal formation granule cell; superior frontal gyrus; More reference expression data
BioGPS	More reference expression data
Gene ontology
Molecular function	G protein-coupled receptor activity; neuropeptide binding; signal transducer activity; peptide hormone binding; galanin receptor activity; protein binding; G protein-coupled peptide receptor activity
Cellular component	integral component of membrane; membrane; plasma membrane; integral component of plasma membrane; intracellular anatomical structure
Biological process	positive regulation of cortisol secretion; negative regulation of adenylate cyclase activity; adenylate cyclase-activating G protein-coupled receptor signaling pathway; positive regulation of cytosolic calcium ion concentration; phospholipase C-activating G protein-coupled receptor signaling pathway; positive regulation of transcription by RNA polymerase II; signal transduction; neuropeptide signaling pathway; G protein-coupled receptor signaling pathway
Sources:Amigo / QuickGO
Orthologs
Databases	NCBI: entry; OMA: entry
Species	Human	Mouse
Entrez	2587	14427
Ensembl	ENSG00000166573	ENSMUSG00000024553
UniProt	P47211	P56479
RefSeq (mRNA)	NM_001480	NM_008082
RefSeq (protein)	NP_001471	NP_032108
Location (UCSC)	Chr 18: 77.25 – 77.28 Mb	Chr 18: 82.41 – 82.42 Mb
PubMed search
- Wikidata
View/Edit Human	View/Edit Mouse

Galanin receptor 1 (GAL_{1}) is a G-protein coupled receptor encoded by the GALR1 gene.

== Function ==
The neuropeptide galanin elicits a range of biological effects by interaction with specific G-protein-coupled receptors. Galanin receptors are seven-trans membrane proteins shown to activate a variety of intracellular second-messenger pathways. GALR1 inhibits adenylyl cyclase via a G protein of the GI/GO family. GALR1 is widely expressed in the brain and spinal cord, as well as in peripheral sites such as the small intestine and heart.

== See also ==
- Galanin receptor
