= Crustacean cardioactive peptide =

Names
- Other names CCAP; PFCNAFTGC-NH2 (disulfide bridge:Cys3-Cys9)

Identifiers
CAS Number	107090-96-0
3D model (JSmol)	Interactive image
Abbreviations	PFCNAFTGC
ChemSpider	32819834
PubChem CID	101630584
- InChI: InChI=1S/C42H57N11O11S2/c1-22-36(58)49-28(17-25-12-7-4-8-13-25)40(62)53-34(23(2)54)42(64)46-19-33(56)48-30(35(44)57)20-65-66-21-31(41(63)51-29(18-32(43)55)38(60)47-22)52-39(61)27(16-24-10-5-3-6-11-24)50-37(59)26-14-9-15-45-26/h3-8,10-13,22-23,26-31,34,45,54H,9,14-21H2,1-2H3,(H2,43,55)(H2,44,57)(H,46,64)(H,47,60)(H,48,56)(H,49,58)(H,50,59)(H,51,63)(H,52,61)(H,53,62)/t22-,23+,26-,27-,28-,29-,30-,31-,34-/m0/s1 Key: KUAKWTJOHSDJOA-HNGYRCOKSA-N
- SMILES: C[C@H]1C(=O)N[C@H](C(=O)N[C@H](C(=O)NCC(=O)N[C@@H](CSSC[C@@H](C(=O)N[C@H](C(=O)N1)CC(=O)N)NC(=O)[C@H](CC2=CC=CC=C2)NC(=O)[C@@H]3CCCN3)C(=O)N)[C@@H](C)O)CC4=CC=CC=C4

Properties
Chemical formula	C_{42}H_{57}N_{11}O_{11}S_{2}
Molar mass	956.10 g·mol^{−1}
- Except where otherwise noted, data are given for materials in their standard state (at 25 °C [77 °F], 100 kPa). Infobox references

Crustacean cardioactive peptide (CCAP) is a highly conserved, amidated cyclic nonapeptide with the primary structure PFCNAFTGC-NH_{2} (ProPheCysAsnAlaPheThrGlyCys-NH_{2}) and a disulfide bridge between Cys3 and Cys9. It is found in crustaceans and insects where it behaves as a cardioaccelerator, neuropeptide transmitter for other areas of the nervous system and a hormone. CCAP was first isolated from the pericardial organs of the shore crab Carcinus maenas, where it has a role in regulating heartbeat. It was assumed that this was the peptide's main function and its name reflects this.

== Function ==
As well as C. maenas, CCAP has cardioacceleratory properties in Manduca sexta and Drosophila melanogaster; it is a highly conserved protein found in species as diverse as moths and fruit flies in addition to the crustacean it was originally identified in. Under specific conditions, CCAP has also been shown to induce cardiac reversal in M. sexta and D. melanogaster.

Since CCAP was first identified and its possible role suggested, it has been proven it serves many other functions. It regulates release of adipokinetic hormone during sustained flight in L. migratoria. It is also important in metabolism and digestion in other species; CCAP is involved as a hormone in the cockroach Periplaneta americana by upregulating digestive hormones after the insect has fed on nutritional matter. In the crab Cancer borealis CCAP controls passage of food through the foregut by modulating the stomatogastric ganglion's pyloric rhythm. This suggests CCAP is involved primarily in movement of food along the gut, facilitating digestion by secretion of digestive hormones and increasing flow of blood.

The effects of CCAP on the reproductive organs of females of the species L. migratoria have also been studied. The peptide stimulates the contraction of the oviducts and spermatheca. There is no CCAP or CCAP-like immunoreactivity shown in the oviduct or the nerves innervating the oviduct so it is probable that CCAP acts as a neurohormone to perform these functions.

CCAP is one of several peptides and hormones to be involved in the moulting process of crustaceans and insects.

== Effects of lack of CCAP ==
There have been no mutant individuals of any species found to possess CCAP who have a genetic defect meaning they are not able to produce the peptide. It is likely any such mutation would be lethal. In Drosophila the destruction of CCAP-containing neurons during development causes major changes in and disruptions to timing and behaviour of moulting.
