= GPCR neuropeptide receptor =

Receptor that binds to neuropeptides

GPCR neuropeptide receptors are G-protein coupled receptors which bind various neuropeptides. Members include:

- Neuropeptide B/W receptor
  - NPBWR1
  - NPBWR2
- Neuropeptide FF receptor
  - NPFFR1
  - NPFFR2
- Neuropeptide S receptor
  - NPSR1
- Neuropeptide Y receptor
  - Y_{1} - NPY1R
  - Y_{2} - NPY2R
  - Y_{4} - PPYR1
  - Y_{5} - NPY5R
