= Neuropeptide Y receptor =

Protein family

neuropeptide Y receptor type 1

Identifiers
- Symbol: NPY1R
- Alt. symbols: NPYR
- NCBI gene: 4886
- HGNC: 7956
- OMIM: 162641
- RefSeq: NM_000909
- UniProt: P25929

Other data
- Locus: Chr. 4 q31.3-q32
Search for
- Structures: Swiss-model
- Domains: InterPro

neuropeptide Y receptor type 2

Identifiers
- Symbol: NPY2R
- NCBI gene: 4887
- HGNC: 7957
- OMIM: 162642
- RefSeq: NM_000910
- UniProt: P49146

Other data
- Locus: Chr. 4 q31
Search for
- Structures: Swiss-model
- Domains: InterPro

neuropeptide Y receptor type 4

Identifiers
- Symbol: NPY4R
- Alt. symbols: PPYR1, Y4, PP1
- NCBI gene: 5540
- HGNC: 9329
- OMIM: 601790
- RefSeq: NM_005972
- UniProt: P50391

Other data
- Locus: Chr. 10 q11.2
Search for
- Structures: Swiss-model
- Domains: InterPro

neuropeptide Y receptor type 5

Identifiers
- Symbol: NPY5R
- NCBI gene: 4889
- HGNC: 7958
- OMIM: 602001
- RefSeq: NM_006174
- UniProt: Q15761

Other data
- Locus: Chr. 4 q31-q32
Search for
- Structures: Swiss-model
- Domains: InterPro

Neuropeptide Y receptors are a family of receptors belonging to class A G-protein coupled receptors and they are activated by the closely related peptide hormones neuropeptide Y, peptide YY and pancreatic polypeptide. These receptors are involved in the control of a diverse set of behavioral processes including appetite, circadian rhythm, and anxiety.

Activated neuropeptide receptors release the G_{i} subunit from the heterotrimeric G protein complex. The G_{i} subunit in turn inhibits the production of the second messenger cAMP from ATP.

Only the crystal structure of Y1 in complex with two antagonist is available.

== Types ==
There are five known mammalian neuropeptide Y receptors designated Y_{1} through Y_{5}. Four neuropeptide Y receptors each encoded by a different gene have been identified in humans, all of which may represent therapeutic targets for obesity and other disorders.

- Y_{1} - NPY1R
- Y_{2} - NPY2R
- Y_{4} - NPY4R
- Y_{5} - NPY5R

== Antagonists ==
- BIBP-3226
- Lu AA-33810
- BIIE-0246
- UR-AK49
