= CYM50769 =

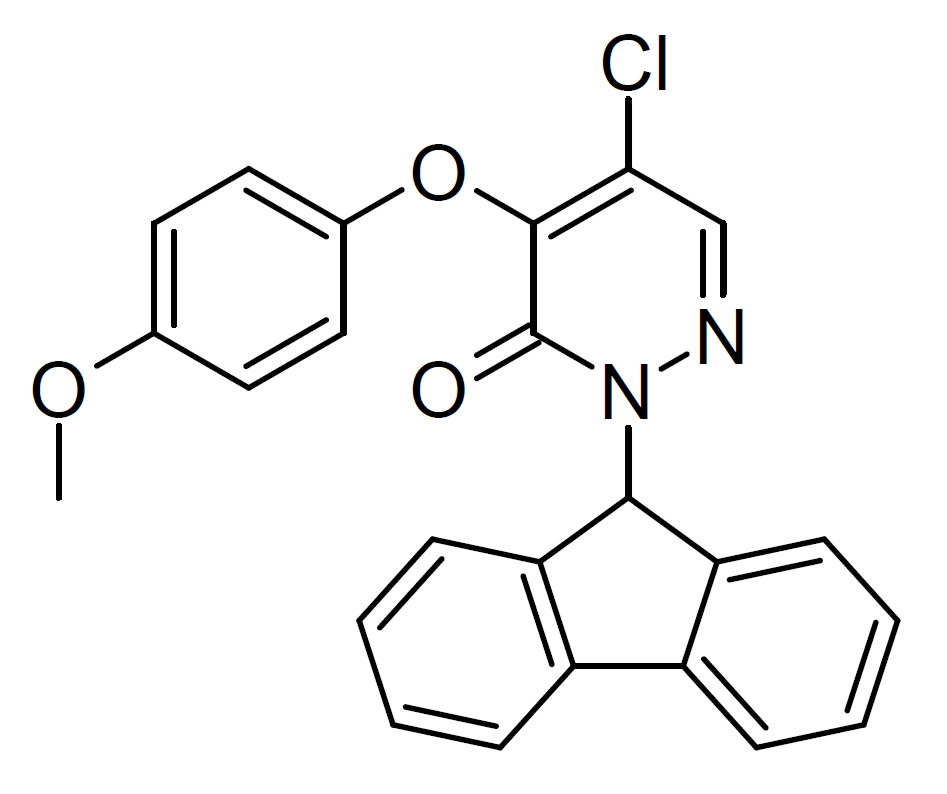

Clinical data
- ATC code: none

Identifiers
- IUPAC name: 5-chloro-2-(9H-fluoren-9-yl)-4-(4-methoxyphenoxy)pyridazin-3-one
- CAS Number: 1421365-63-0
- PubChem CID: 50904505
- ChemSpider: 28494696
- ChEMBL: ChEMBL1972527

Chemical and physical data
- Formula: C_{24}H_{17}ClN_{2}O_{3}
- Molar mass: 416.86 g·mol^{−1}
- 3D model (JSmol): Interactive image
- SMILES: COC1=CC=C(C=C1)OC2=C(C=NN(C2=O)C3C4=CC=CC=C4C5=CC=CC=C35)Cl
- InChI: InChI=1S/C24H17ClN2O3/c1-29-15-10-12-16(13-11-15)30-23-21(25)14-26-27(24(23)28)22-19-8-4-2-6-17(19)18-7-3-5-9-20(18)22/h2-14,22H,1H3; Key:QHVSQUYCVUHYKT-UHFFFAOYSA-N

CYM50769 is a drug which acts as a selective, non-peptide antagonist at the Neuropeptides B/W receptor NPBW1. It is used for fundamental research into the structure and function of the NPBW1 receptor, and has antidepressant effects in animal studies.
