= Masashi Yanagisawa =

Japanese molecular biologist

- 柳沢 正史
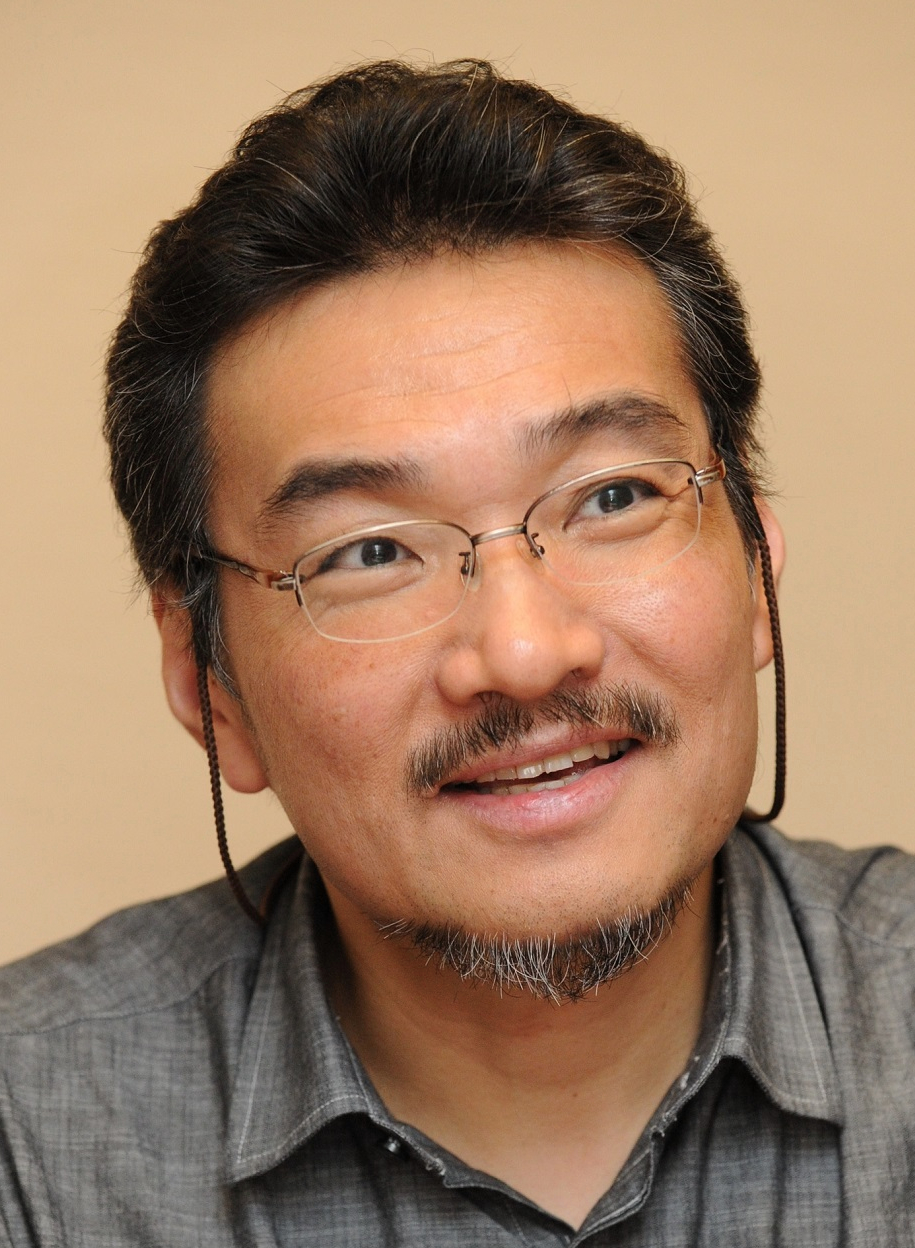
- Born: May 25, 1960 (age 66); Tokyo, Japan
- Citizenship: United States
- Education: University of Tsukuba (MD, PhD)
- Awards: Kilby International Awards; Bristol-Myers Squibb Award for Distinguished Achievement in Cardiovascular Research; Medal of Honor with Purple Ribbon; Asahi Prize; Keio Medical Science Prize; Person of Cultural Merit; Breakthrough Prize in Life Sciences; Albert Lasker Award for Basic Medical Research
- Scientific career
- Fields: Molecular biology
- Workplaces: Kyoto University; University of Texas Southwestern Medical Center; Howard Hughes Medical Institute; University of Tsukuba
- Thesis: A novel potent vasoconstrictor peptide produced by vascular endothelial cells (1988)
- Doctoral advisor: Tomoh Masaki

Masashi Yanagisawa (柳沢 正史, Yanagisawa Masashi; born May 25, 1960) is a Japanese-American molecular biologist and physician, famous for his discovery of the hormone endothelin and the neuropeptide orexin, the absence of which is the cause of narcolepsy. He is currently the Director of the International Institute for Integrative Sleep Medicine, University of Tsukuba, and an adjunct professor at the Department of Molecular Genetics, University of Texas Southwestern Medical Center.

== Early life and education ==
Yanagisawa was born in Tokyo in 1960. His father was a surgeon and, thanks to his background in electrical and electronic engineering, an electrophysiology researcher. He graduated from Musashi Junior and Senior High School in 1979, and entered the University of Tsukuba to study medicine. After obtaining an MD in 1985, he pursued a PhD at the same institute, completing it 3 years later.

== Career ==
Immediately after obtaining his PhD, Yanagisawa started his career as a postdoctoral fellow at the Department of Pharmacology of the University of Tsukuba. One year later, he became an assistant professor at the same department, and in 1991 moved to the Kyoto University School of Medicine as an assistant professor at the Department of Pharmacology.

Yanagisawa stayed at Kyoto only for one year, after which Joseph L. Goldstein and Michael Stuart Brown, both 1985 Nobel Prize in Physiology or Medicine laureates and famous for their research in cholesterol, recruited him to the University of Texas Southwestern Medical Center (UTSW). He began as an associate professor at the Department of Molecular genetics, was promoted to full professor in 1996, and endowed with the Patrick E. Haggerty Distinguished Chair in Basic Biomedical Science in 1998.

Between 2001 and 2006, he had his own project under the Japan Science and Technology Agency ERATO (Exploratory Research for Advanced Technology) scheme, focusing on discovering endogenous ligands for orphan receptors.

He returned to Japan in 2012 to found and direct the International Institute for Integrative Sleep Medicine at the University of Tsukuba, which was established under the World Premier International Research Center Initiative by Japan's Ministry of Education, Culture, Sports, Science and Technology. Two years later, he switched to part-time at UTSW as an adjunct professor. Yanagisawa was also an investigator at the Howard Hughes Medical Institute during his time working full-time at UTSW.

== Research ==
Yanagisawa is most well known for his discovery of the hormone endothelin and the neuropeptide orexin. Early 1980s saw the revelation that nitric oxide was the substance endothelial cells produce to relax the smooth muscle around blood vessels, which causes vasodilation and increased blood flow. This led to the speculation of and hunt for the inverse, an endothelium-derived vasoconstricting substance. During his PhD study, Yanagisawa's supervisor, Tomoh Masaki, agreed to let him try to isolate the substance. This study became his PhD thesis, and he published his finding it 1988, naming the substance "endothelin" and reporting its peptide sequence. He then published a number of reports on the function and regulation of endothelin, including working with Takeshi Sakurai to identify the receptor for endothelin.

He kept studying endothelin after moving to the University of Texas Southwestern Medical Center (UTSW) in the United States, for example discovering one of the mechanisms to activate endothelin and that a mutation in endothelin receptor can cause Hirschsprung's disease.

Eventually, his interest in endothelin diminished and Yanagisawa switched his focus to orphan receptors, which are receptors whose endogenous ligands have yet to be identified, particularly orphan G protein-coupled receptors (GPCRs). In 1998, again teaming up with Takeshi Sakurai, who has moved to the United States as a postdoctoral fellow at UTSW, Yanagisawa connected two orphan GPCRs with a family of neuropeptides as their ligands. They named it "orexin" after the Greek word for appetite, since the neuropeptide was found exclusively in the hypothalamus, a brain region that regulates appetite, and because mice consumed more food after receiving a dose of orexin. Another group at The Scripps Research Institute (now Scripps Research) made the same discovery in the same year, and named the neuropeptide "hypocretin". Today, "hypocretin" (or HCRT) is used to refer to the gene and transcript, while "orexin" is used to refer to the peptide.

Yanagisawa and his team then knocked out the orexin gene in mice, hoping to see the animal eating less. Instead, they observed behavior similar to the human condition of narcolepsy, whose cause at the time was still unknown. The association between orexin and narcolepsy was definitively established not long afterwards in 2000.

Since then, his research has mostly focused on studying sleep and orphan receptors. For example, he uncovered the functions of GPR7 (NPBW1) and GPR8 (NPBW2), GPR41 (FFA3), and GPR103 (QRFPR).

More recently, using an unbiased forward genetics approach, which randomly introduced mutations in mice and then observed their electrocardiogram and electromyogram, Yanagisawa and his team reported the role of KIAA0999 (encoded by the Sik3 gene) and NALCN (encoded by the Nalcn gene) in regulating sleep. His team also identified the phosphorylation and dephosphorylation of 80 proteins as a major regulation mechanism of the sleep cycle in mice.

== Honors and awards ==
- Kilby International Awards (1998)
- Robert J. and Claire Pasarow Foundation Award in Cardiovascular Medical Research (1997)
- Novartis Award For Hypertension Research, American Heart Association (1998)
- John J. Abel Award in Pharmacology, American Society for Pharmacology and Experimental Therapeutics (1998)
- Amgen Award, American Society of Biochemistry and Molecular Biology (1999)
- Jacobæus Prize, Novo Nordisk Foundation (2001)
- Bristol-Myers Squibb Award for Distinguished Achievement in Cardiovascular Research (2003)
- Member of the National Academy of Sciences (2003)
- Ulf von Euler lecture, Karolinska Institute (2012)
- Walter B. Cannon Award Lectureship, American Physiological Society (2015)
- Medal of Honor with Purple Ribbon (2016)
- Asahi Prize (2017)
- Keio Medical Science Prize (2018)
- Person of Cultural Merit (2019)
- Breakthrough Prize in Life Sciences (2023)
- Clarivate Citation Laureates (2023)
- Asian Scientist 100 (2024)
- Albert Lasker Award for Basic Medical Research (2026)

== Personal life ==
Yanagisawa is married, and is a Baptist Christian since his second year of PhD. He plays the flute.
