= C16H27N5O =

The molecular formula C_{16}H_{27}N_{5}O (molar mass : 305.426 g/mol) may refer to:

- UR-AK49
- Lomardexamfetamine (KP-106)
