= Neuropeptide B =

Protein-coding gene in the species Homo sapiens

NPB

Identifiers
- Aliases: NPB, L7, PPL7, PPneuropeptide B
- External IDs: OMIM: 607996; MGI: 2387153; GeneCards: NPB

Gene location (Human)
Chr.	Chromosome 17 (human)
Band	17q25.3	Start	81,900,745 bp
Band	17q25.3	End	81,902,905 bp

Gene location (Mouse)
Chr.	Chromosome 11 (mouse)
Band	11|11 E2	Start	120,499,303 bp
Band	11|11 E2	End	120,499,919 bp
RNA expression pattern
Bgee	Human / Mouse (ortholog); Top expressed in: C1 segment; testicle; hypothalamus; substantia nigra; nucleus accumbens; amygdala; stromal cell of endometrium; Brodmann area 9; putamen; anterior cingulate cortex / Top expressed in: stomach; embryo; testicle; morula; embryo; right kidney; spermatid; placenta; urinary bladder; cerebellar cortex; More reference expression data
BioGPS	n/a
Gene ontology
Molecular function	protein binding; G protein-coupled receptor binding
Cellular component	extracellular region
Biological process	neuropeptide signaling pathway; G protein-coupled receptor signaling pathway
Sources:Amigo / QuickGO
Orthologs
Databases	NCBI: entry; OMA: entry
Species	Human	Mouse
Entrez	256933	208990
Ensembl	ENSG00000183979	ENSMUSG00000044034
UniProt	Q8NG41	Q8K4P1
RefSeq (mRNA)	NM_148896	NM_153288; NM_001347616; NM_001347617
RefSeq (protein)	NP_683694	NP_001334545; NP_001334546; NP_695020
Location (UCSC)	Chr 17: 81.9 – 81.9 Mb	Chr 11: 120.5 – 120.5 Mb
PubMed search
- Wikidata
View/Edit Human	View/Edit Mouse

Neuropeptide B is a short biologically active peptide whose precursor in humans is encoded by the NPB gene. Neuropeptide B acts via two G protein-coupled receptors, neuropeptide B/W receptors, called NPBW1 and NPBW2 encoded by the genes NPBWR1 and NPBWR2, respectively. Neuropeptide B is thought to be associated with the regulation of feeding, neuroendocrine system, memory, learning and in the afferent pain pathway. It is expressed throughout the central nervous system with high levels in the substantia nigra, hypothalamus, hippocampus, and spinal cord.

== Function ==
The functions of neuropeptide B mirror the functions of the closely related neuropeptide W in many respects, as they bind to the same receptor targets but differ mainly in their levels of expression in different tissues, and when and how they are released. However, while neuropeptide W binds to both NPBW1 and NPBW2 with similar affinity, neuropeptide B is relatively selective for NPBW1 and binds only weakly to NPBW2. Central actions of neuropeptide B include regulation of appetite and energy homeostasis, reproductive behavior, pain, anxiety, and emotions. Peripheral actions include regulating secretion of adrenal hormones, and various regulatory roles in pancreatic beta cells and adipose tissue.

== See also ==
- Neuropeptide FF
