= Y4 =

Y4 may refer to:

- LNER Class Y4, a class of British steam locomotive
- Neuropeptide Y receptor type 4, a protein
- Volaris, a Mexican airline
- Y4, a Mazda diesel engine

== See also ==
- 4Y (disambiguation)
