= Neuropeptide W =

Mammalian protein found in Homo sapiens

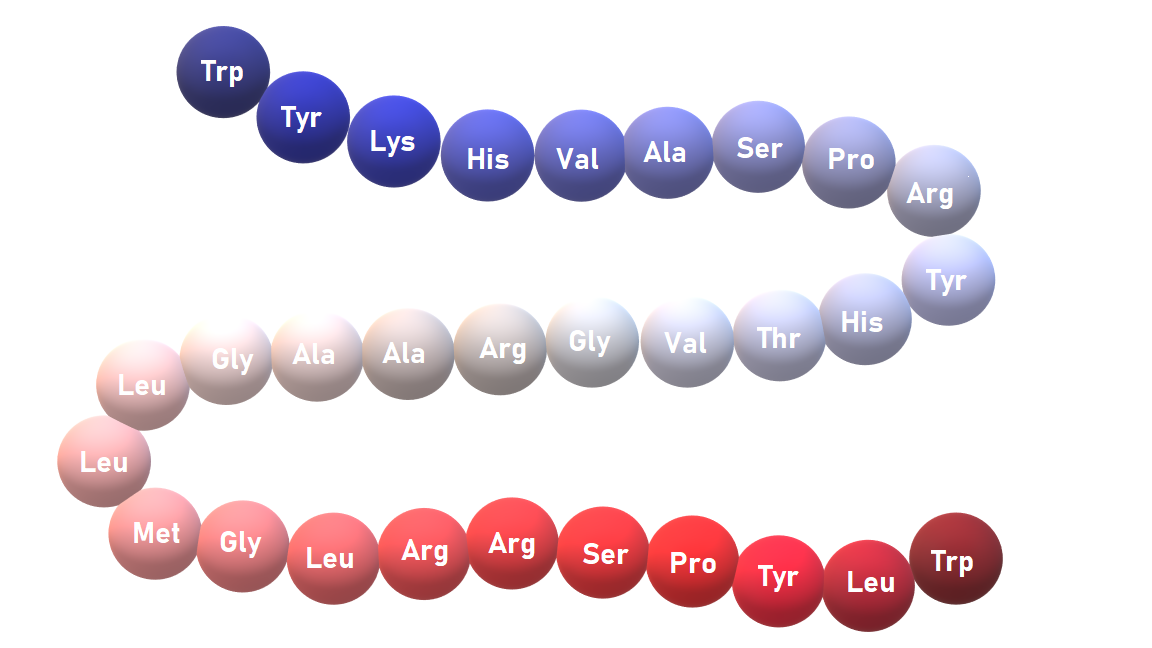
- Neuropeptide W primary sequence using three letters code. N-terminal represented in blue. C-terminal represented in red.

Identifiers
- Symbol: ?
- UniProt: Q8N729

Other data
- Wikidata: Q21173201
Search for
- Structures: Swiss-model
- Domains: InterPro

Neuropeptide W or preprotein L8 is a short human neuropeptide. Neuropeptide W acts as a ligand for two neuropeptide B/W receptors, NPBWR1 and NPBWR2, which are integrated in GPCRs family of alpha-helical transmembrane proteins.

== Structure ==
There are two forms of neuropeptide W whose precursor is encoded by NPW gene.

The 23-amino-acid form (neuropeptide W-23) is the one that activates the receptors whereas the C-terminally extended form (neuropeptide W-30) is less effective. These isoforms were demonstrated in different species like rat, human, chicken, mouse and pig.

The name of neuropeptide W is due to the tryptophan residues located on both sides, the N- side and -C side, in its two mature forms.

== Location ==
Neuropeptide W was first identified in porcine hypothalamus in 2002. In humans, it is highly confined in neurons of the substantia nigra and the spinal cord, and fewer expressed in neurons of the hippocampus, hypothalamus, amygdala, parietal cortex and cerebellum. It can also be found in some peripheral tissues such as trachea, stomach, liver, kidney, prostate, uterus and ovary. It has to be said that tissue distribution information is still lacking. For the moment, Neuropeptide W location differences between studied species (rat, mouse, chicken, pig) are slight, even though quantities differ between the organs.

== Function ==
=== Neuropeptide W in CNS ===
Neuropeptide W in the central nervous system is implicated in feeding activity and energy metabolism, in the adrenal axis stress response, and the regulation of neuroendocrine functions like hormone release from the pituitary gland, but it is not considered as an inhibitory or regulatory factor in it. Neuropeptide W may also be involved in autonomic regulation, pain sensation, emotions, anxiety and fear. Neuropeptide W has been shown to have analgesic and anticonvulsant effects, suggesting that its receptors may have useful medical applications.

It seems that regulation of feeding behaviour and energy metabolism is the primary function of the neuropeptide W signaling system. On the one hand, Neuropeptide W regulates the endocrine signals aimed at anterior hypophysis. This stimulates both the need for water (thirst) and the need for food (hunger). On the other hand, it plays a compensatory role in energy metabolism.

Regarding the adrenal axis response to stress, it plays a relevant role as a messenger in brain networks that help the activation of HPA (hypothalamic–pituitary–adrenal axis), which will cause the response to stress.

An example of neuroendocrine functions is the regulation of the secretion of cortisol due to the activation or deactivation of neuropeptide B/W receptors.

Moreover, Neuropeptide W is found in an area that is connected with preauthonomic centers in the brain stem and spinal cord. Because of this location, there is a chance that it can affect some cardiovascular function.

Infusion of neuropeptide W has been shown to suppress the eating of food and body weight and increase heat production and body temperature, this verifies its works as an endogenous catabolic signaling molecule.

=== Neuropeptide W in peripheral tissues ===
While the central roles of neuropeptide W are better studied, it is also important in peripheral tissues in functions such as regulation of vascular muscle tone, regulation of gastric tension sensitive vagus nerve signalling, and insulin secretion.

== See also ==
- Neuropeptide B
- Neuropeptide FF
