= Y6 =

Y6 may refer to:

- LNER Class Y6, a class of British steam locomotives
- Neuropeptide Y receptor Y6, a human gene
- SJ Y6, a series of diesel railcar s operated by Statens Järnvägar (SJ) of Sweden
- Year 6, like in French Republican Calendar/Y6
- A Mazda diesel engines
- An honors Judaic Studies class at Hillel Yeshiva High School
- Batavia Air, IATA code Y6

Y-6 may refer to:* The Chinese designation for the Ilyushin Il-14 aircraft.

== See also ==
- 6Y (disambiguation)
