= UR-AK49 =

Chemical compound

Clinical data
- Other names: UR-AK49

Identifiers
- IUPAC name: 3-cyclohexyl-N-[N'-[3-(1H-imidazol-5-yl)propyl]carbamimidoyl]propanamide
- CAS Number: 902154-32-9
- PubChem CID: 25149433
- ChemSpider: 21486130
- UNII: 5HML8P3QAT
- ChEMBL: ChEMBL486974
- CompTox Dashboard (EPA): DTXSID701028442

Chemical and physical data
- Formula: C_{16}H_{27}N_{5}O
- Molar mass: 305.426 g·mol^{−1}
- 3D model (JSmol): Interactive image
- SMILES: c1c(nc[nH]1)CCCNC(=N)NC(=O)CCC2CCCCC2
- InChI: InChI=1S/C16H27N5O/c17-16(19-10-4-7-14-11-18-12-20-14)21-15(22)9-8-13-5-2-1-3-6-13/h11-13H,1-10H2,(H,18,20)(H3,17,19,21,22); Key:QBGKYFYOFBXHFM-UHFFFAOYSA-N

UR-AK49 is a drug used in scientific research which acts as a potent antagonist for the Neuropeptide Y / Pancreatic polypeptide receptor Y_{4}, and also as a partial agonist at the histamine receptors H_{1} and H_{2}. UR-AK49 is a pure antagonist at Y_{4} with no partial agonist effects, and although it is only slightly selective for Y_{4} over the related Y_{1} and Y_{5} receptors, as the first non-peptide Y_{4} antagonist developed UR-AK49 is expected to be useful in the study of this receptor and its role in the body.
