= Mary Ann Raghanti =

American biological anthropologist

Academic background
- Education: Kent State University
- Thesis: Differences in cortical dopamine, acetylcholine, and serotonin innervation among humans, chimpanzees, and macaques (2007)

Mary Ann Raghanti is an American biological anthropologist. She is a fellow of the American Association for the Advancement of Science. She won an Ig Nobel Prize.

She teaches at Kent State University.

She researched neuropeptide Y. and beta-amyloid protein.

== Selected publications ==
- Sherwood, Chet C.; Stimpson, Cheryl D.; Raghanti, Mary Ann; Wildman, Derek E.; Uddin, Monica; Grossman, Lawrence I.; Goodman, Morris; Redmond, John C.; Bonar, Christopher J.; Erwin, Joseph M.; Hof, Patrick R. (2006-09-12). "Evolution of increased glia–neuron ratios in the human frontal cortex". Proceedings of the National Academy of Sciences. 103 (37): 13606–13611. doi:10.1073/pnas.0605843103. ISSN 0027-8424. PMC 1564260. PMID 16938869.
- Sousa, André M. M.; Zhu, Ying; Raghanti, Mary Ann; Kitchen, Robert R.; Onorati, Marco; Tebbenkamp, Andrew T. N.; Stutz, Bernardo; Meyer, Kyle A.; Li, Mingfeng; Kawasawa, Yuka Imamura; Liu, Fuchen; Perez, Raquel Garcia; Mele, Marta; Carvalho, Tiago; Skarica, Mario; Gulden, Forrest O.; Pletikos, Mihovil; Shibata, Akemi; Stephenson, Alexa R.; Edler, Melissa K.; Ely, John J.; Elsworth, John D.; Horvath, Tamas L.; Hof, Patrick R.; Hyde, Thomas M.; Kleinman, Joel E.; Weinberger, Daniel R.; Reimers, Mark; Lifton, Richard P.; Mane, Shrikant M.; Noonan, James P.; State, Matthew W.; Lein, Ed S.; Knowles, James A.; Marques-Bonet, Tomas; Sherwood, Chet C.; Gerstein, Mark B.; Sestan, Nenad (2017-11-24). "Molecular and cellular reorganization of neural circuits in the human lineage". Science. 358 (6366). American Association for the Advancement of Science (AAAS): 1027–1032. Bibcode:2017Sci...358.1027S. doi:10.1126/science.aan3456. ISSN 0036-8075. PMC 5776074. PMID 29170230.
- Bauernfeind, Amy L.; de Sousa, Alexandra A.; Avasthi, Tanvi; Dobson, Seth D.; Raghanti, Mary Ann; Lewandowski, Albert H.; Zilles, Karl; Semendeferi, Katerina; Allman, John M.; Craig, Arthur D. (Bud); Hof, Patrick R.; Sherwood, Chet C. (2013). "A volumetric comparison of the insular cortex and its subregions in primates". Journal of Human Evolution. 64 (4). Elsevier BV: 263–279. Bibcode:2013JHumE..64..263B. doi:10.1016/j.jhevol.2012.12.003. ISSN 0047-2484. PMC 3756831. PMID 23466178.
