= NPW =

Protein-coding gene in the species Homo sapiens

Identifiers
- Aliases: NPW, L8, L8C, PPL8, PPneuropeptide W
- External IDs: OMIM: 607997; MGI: 2685781; HomoloGene: 17727; GeneCards: NPW; OMA:NPW - orthologs

Gene location (Human)
| Chr. | Chromosome 16 (human) |
| Band | 16p13.3 | Start | 2,009,926 bp |
| Band | 16p13.3 | End | 2,020,755 bp |

Gene location (Mouse)
| Chr. | Chromosome 17 (mouse) |
| Band | 17|17 A3.3 | Start | 24,876,304 bp |
| Band | 17|17 A3.3 | End | 24,877,431 bp |
RNA expression pattern
| Bgee | Human / Mouse (ortholog); Top expressed in: testicle; decidua; right lobe of liver; gonad; stromal cell of endometrium; pituitary gland; anterior pituitary; olfactory zone of nasal mucosa; skin of abdomen; skin of leg / Top expressed in: embryo; lung; embryo; morula; epiblast; stomach; uterus; pancreas; spleen; superior frontal gyrus; More reference expression data |
| BioGPS | n/a |
Gene ontology
| Molecular function | protein binding; G protein-coupled receptor binding |
| Cellular component | extracellular region |
| Biological process | neuropeptide signaling pathway; feeding behavior; G protein-coupled receptor signaling pathway |
Sources:Amigo / QuickGO
Orthologs
| Species | Human | Mouse |
| Entrez | 283869 | 381073 |
| Ensembl | ENSG00000183971 | ENSMUSG00000071230 |
| UniProt | Q8N729 | Q3V2F0 |
| RefSeq (mRNA) | NM_001099456 | NM_001099664 |
| RefSeq (protein) | NP_001092926 | NP_001093134 |
| Location (UCSC) | Chr 16: 2.01 – 2.02 Mb | Chr 17: 24.88 – 24.88 Mb |
| PubMed search |
- Wikidata
| View/Edit Human | View/Edit Mouse |

NPW is a gene that in humans encodes Neuropeptide W protein.

Neuropeptide W (NPW) is an endogenous peptide ligand for GPR8 (MIM 600731), a G protein-coupled receptor.[supplied by OMIM]
