= 4Y =

4Y or 4-Y may refer to:

- 4 years
- 4Y, IATA code for Eurowings Discover and Airbus Transport International (controlled duplicate)
- 4Y, a series of models of Toyota Y engine
- 4Y, the production code for the 1978 Doctor Who serial Underworld

== See also ==
- Y4 (disambiguation)
