= Peptide YY =

Peptide released from cells in the ileum and colon in response to feeding

PYY
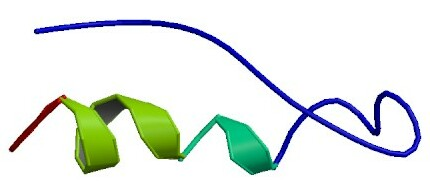

Identifiers
- Aliases: PYY, PYY-I, PYY1, peptide YY
- External IDs: OMIM: 600781; MGI: 99924; GeneCards: PYY
Available structures
PDB	Ortholog search: PDBe RCSB
PDB	List of PDB id codes 2L60, 2DEZ, 2DF0

Gene location (Human)
Chr.	Chromosome 17 (human)
Band	17q21.31	Start	43,952,733 bp
Band	17q21.31	End	44,004,469 bp

Gene location (Mouse)
Chr.	Chromosome 11 (mouse)
Band	11|11 D	Start	101,997,502 bp
Band	11|11 D	End	101,998,658 bp
RNA expression pattern
Bgee	Human / Mouse (ortholog); Top expressed in: mucosa of sigmoid colon; mucosa of transverse colon; rectum; testicle; gonad; mucosa of ileum; epithelium of colon; jejunal mucosa; duodenum; appendix / Top expressed in: islet of Langerhans; left colon; ileum; intestinal villus; embryo; blastocyst; embryo; jejunum; crypt of lieberkuhn of small intestine; duodenum; More reference expression data
BioGPS	n/a
Gene ontology
Molecular function	protein binding; hormone activity; neuropeptide hormone activity; G protein-coupled receptor binding
Cellular component	extracellular region; extracellular space
Biological process	G protein-coupled receptor signaling pathway; regulation of appetite; cell population proliferation; neuropeptide signaling pathway; feeding behavior; regulation of signaling receptor activity; intestinal epithelial cell differentiation
Sources:Amigo / QuickGO
Orthologs
Databases	NCBI: entry; OMA: entry
Species	Human	Mouse
Entrez	5697	217212
Ensembl	ENSG00000131096	ENSMUSG00000017311
UniProt	P10082	Q9EPS2
RefSeq (mRNA)	NM_004160; NM_001394028; NM_001394029	NM_145435; NM_001346771
RefSeq (protein)	NP_004151	NP_001333700; NP_663410
Location (UCSC)	Chr 17: 43.95 – 44 Mb	Chr 11: 102 – 102 Mb
PubMed search
- Wikidata
View/Edit Human	View/Edit Mouse

Peptide YY (PYY), also known as peptide tyrosine tyrosine, is a peptide that in humans is encoded by the PYY gene. Peptide YY is a short (36-amino acid) peptide released from cells in the ileum and colon in response to feeding. In the blood, gut, and other elements of periphery, PYY acts to reduce appetite; similarly, when injected directly into the central nervous system, PYY is also anorexigenic, i.e., it reduces appetite.

Dietary fibers from fruits, vegetables, and whole grains, consumed, increase the speed of transit of intestinal chyme into the ileum, to raise PYY_{3-36}, and induce satiety. Peptide YY cannot be produced as the result of enzymatic breakdown of crude fish proteins and ingested as a food product.

== Structure ==
Peptide YY is related to the pancreatic peptide family by having 18 of its 36 amino acids located in the same positions as pancreatic peptide. The two major forms of peptide YY are PYY_{1-36} and PYY_{3-36}, which have PP fold structural motifs. However, the most common form of circulating PYY immunoreactivity is PYY_{3-36}, which binds to the Y2 receptor (Y2R) of the Y family of receptors. Peptide YY_{3-36} (PYY) is a linear polypeptide consisting of 36 amino acids with structural homology to NPY and pancreatic polypeptide.

The PP-fold motif is found throughout this family and relates to the 3D structure. The PP-fold is formed through the incorporation of certain residues which are predominately Pro2, Pro5, Pro8, Gly9, Tyr20 and Tyr27. This PP-fold has been found to protect the peptide against enzymatic attack as well as producing a hydrophobic pocket which is inherently overall energy reducing. In addition to containing the PP-fold motif, PYY and its derivative PYY3- 36 also have a high C-terminal α-helix proportion, suggested to be extremely important for the structural integrity of PYY.

== Release ==
PYY is found in L cells in the mucosa of gastrointestinal tract, especially in ileum and colon. Also, a small amount of PYY, about 1-10%, is found in the esophagus, stomach, duodenum and jejunum. PYY concentration in the circulation increases postprandially (after food ingestion) and decreases by fasting. In addition, PYY is produced by a discrete population of neurons in the brainstem, specifically localized to the gigantocellular reticular nucleus of the medulla oblongata. C. R. Gustavsen et al. had found PYY-producing cells located in the islets of Langerhans in rats. They were observed either alone or co-localized with glucagon or PP.

PYY is released by the L-cells of the gastrointestinal tract following food intake, and there are two main endogenous forms: PYY_{1-36} and PYY_{3-36}. PYY_{1-36} is rapidly processed by the enzyme DPP4 to the 34-amino acid peptide PYY_{3-36.} DPP4 hydrolyses PYY and removes the first two amino acids, tyrosine and proline, at the N-terminal, which changes the receptor selectivity. As a result of this, PYY_{3-36} has a high selectivity for the Y2-receptor, compared to PYY_{1-36} which has selectivity for the Y1, Y2, and Y5 receptors. It is thought that the Y1 receptor requires both the C-terminus and N-terminus for recognition, binding and then subsequent activation. The Y2 receptor is thought to have a smaller receptor site and also only requires the C-terminus for recognition.

This could explain the reduced affinity for PYY_{3-36} on any other Y receptor other than Y2. Other studies replacing the amide bonds with ester bonds also confirm that the end section is important in binding and activation. The Y2 receptors are located in the hippocampus, sympathetic and parasympathetic nerve fibres, intestines, and certain blood vessels, and have been implicated in regulating food intake and gastric emptying. As a result of this, the Y2 receptor is considered a target for the treatment of obesity and type II diabetes.

== Function ==
PYY exerts its action through NPY receptors; it inhibits gastric motility and increases water and electrolyte absorption in the colon. PYY may also suppress pancreatic secretion. It is secreted by the neuroendocrine cells in the ileum and colon in response to a meal, and has been shown to reduce appetite. PYY works by slowing the gastric emptying; hence, it increases efficiency of digestion and nutrient absorption after a meal. Research has also indicated PYY may be useful in removing aluminium accumulated in the brain.

== Animal studies ==
Several studies have shown acute peripheral administration of PYY_{3-36} inhibits feeding of rodents and primates. Other studies on Y2R-knockout mice have shown no anorectic effect on them. These findings indicate PYY_{3-36} has an anorectic (losing appetite) effect, which is suggested to be mediated by Y2R. PYY-knockout female mice increase in body weight and fat mass. PYY-knockout mice, on the other hand, are resistant to obesity, but have higher fat mass and lower glucose tolerance when fed a high-fat diet, compared to control mice. Thus, PYY also plays a very important role in energy homeostasis by balancing food intake. PYY oral spray was found to promote fullness. Viral gene therapy of the salivary glands resulted in long-term intake reduction.

== Relevance to obesity ==
Leptin also reduces appetite in response to feeding, but obese people develop a resistance to leptin. Obese people secrete less PYY than non-obese people, and attempts to use PYY directly as a weight-loss drug have met with some success. Researchers noted the caloric intake during a buffet lunch offered two hours after the infusion of PYY was decreased by 30% in obese subjects (p < 0.001) and 31% in lean subjects (p < 0.001).

While some studies have shown obese persons have lower circulating level of PYY postprandially, other studies have reported they have normal sensitivity to the anorectic effect of PYY_{3-36}. Thus, reduction in PYY sensitivity may not be one of the causes of obesity, in contrast to the reduction of leptin sensitivity. The anorectic effect of PYY could possibly be a future obesity drug.

The consumption of protein boosts PYY levels, so some benefit was observed in experimental subjects in reducing hunger and promoting weight loss. This could partially explain the weight-loss experienced with high-protein diets, noting also the high thermic effect of protein.

Obese patients undergoing gastric bypass showed marked metabolic adaptations, resulting in frequent diabetes remission 1 year later. When the confounding of calorie restriction is factored out, β-cell function improves rapidly, very possibly under the influence of enhanced GLP-1 responsiveness. Insulin sensitivity improves in proportion to weight loss, with a possible involvement of PYY.

== See also ==
- Ghrelin
- Leptin
