= Pancreatic islets =

Regions of the pancreas

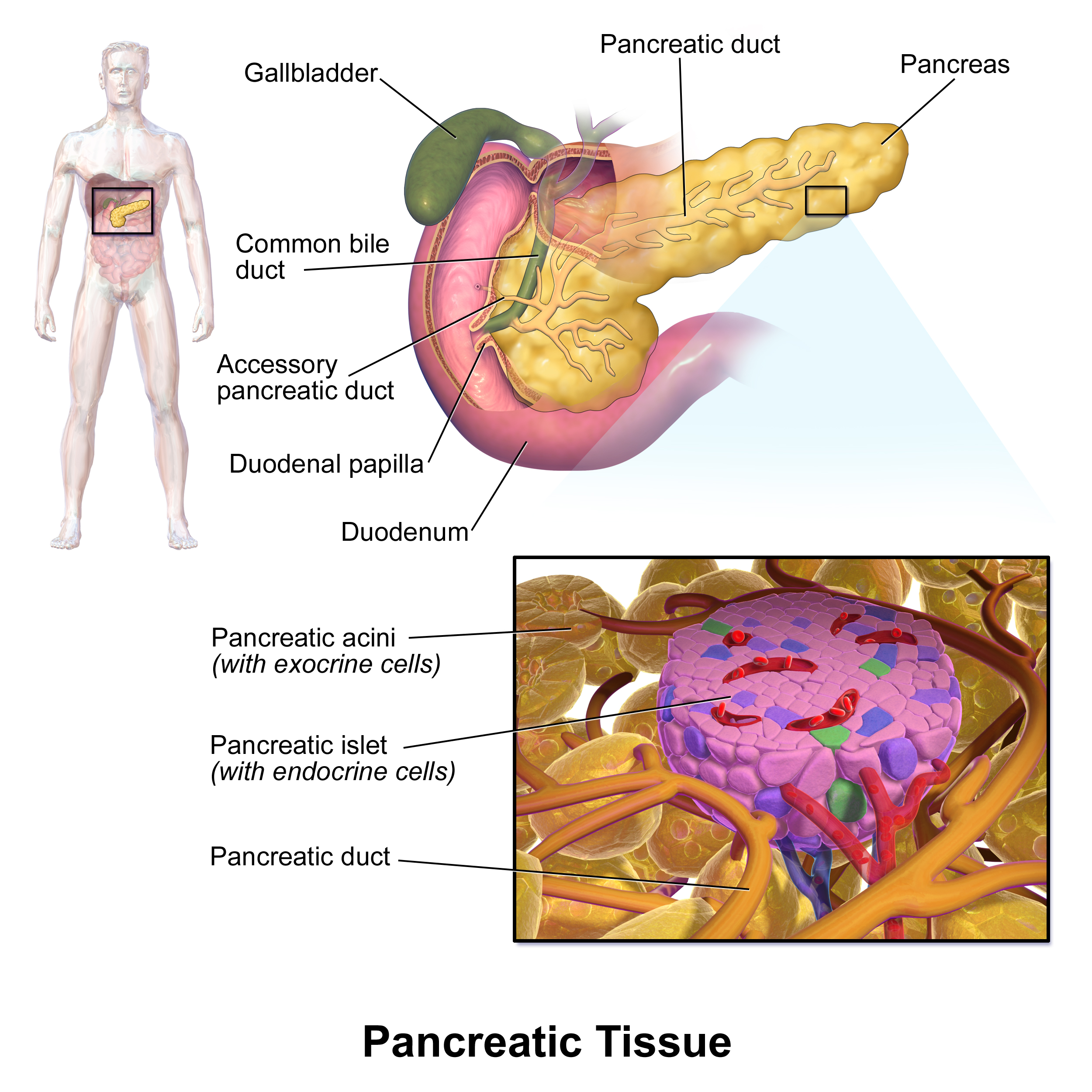
- Pancreatic islets are groups of cells found within the pancreas that release hormones

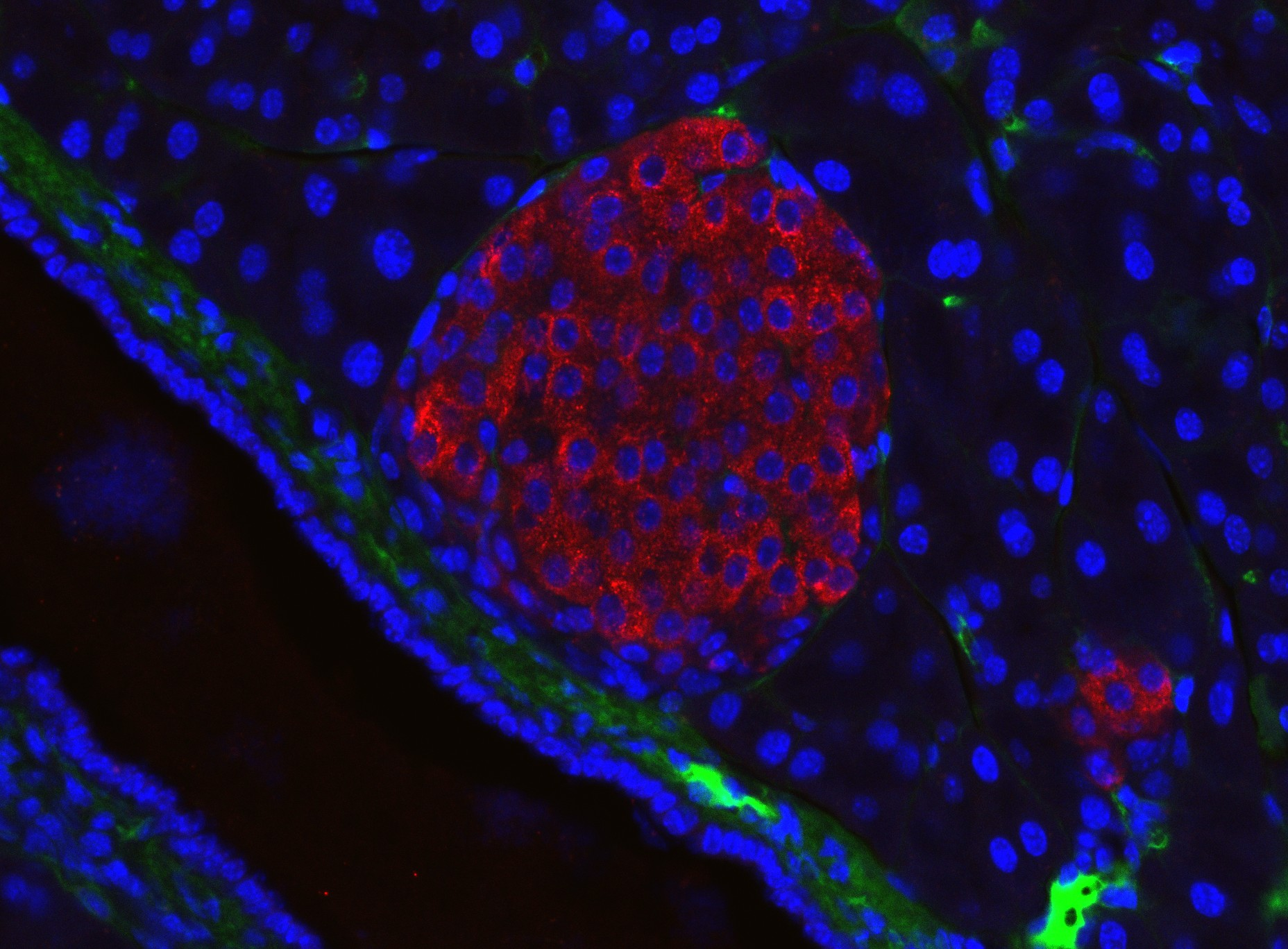
- A pancreatic islet from a mouse in a typical position, close to a blood vessel; insulin in red, nuclei in blue.

Details
- Part of: Pancreas
- System: Endocrine

Identifiers
- Latin: insulae pancreaticae
- MeSH: D007515
- TA98: A05.9.01.019
- TA2: 3128
- FMA: 16016

The pancreatic islets or islets of Langerhans are the regions of the pancreas that contain its endocrine cells (hormone-producing cells), discovered in 1869 by German pathological anatomist Paul Langerhans. The pancreatic islets constitute 1–2% of the pancreas volume and receive 10–15% of its blood flow. The pancreatic islets are arranged in density routes throughout the human pancreas, and are important in the metabolism of glucose.

== Structure ==
There are about 1 million islets distributed throughout the pancreas of a healthy adult human. While islets vary in size, the average diameter is about 0.2 mm.^{:928} Each islet is separated from the surrounding pancreatic tissue by a thin, fibrous, connective tissue capsule which is continuous with the fibrous connective tissue that is interwoven throughout the rest of the pancreas.^{:928}

=== Microanatomy ===
Hormones produced in the pancreatic islets are secreted directly into the blood flow by (at least) five types of cells. In rat islets, endocrine cell types are distributed as follows:

- Alpha cells producing glucagon (20% of total islet cells)
- Beta cells producing insulin and amylin (≈70%)
- PP cells (gamma cells or F cells) producing pancreatic polypeptide (<5%)
- Delta cells producing somatostatin (<10%)
- Epsilon cells producing ghrelin (<1%)

It has been recognized that the cytoarchitecture of pancreatic islets differs between species. In particular, while rodent islets are characterized by a predominant proportion of insulin-producing beta cells in the core of the cluster and by scarce alpha, delta and PP cells in the periphery, human islets display alpha and beta cells in close relationship with each other throughout the cluster.

The proportion of beta cells in islets varies depending on the species, in humans it is about 40–50%. In addition to endocrine cells, there are stromal cells (fibroblasts), vascular cells (endothelial cells, pericytes), immune cells (granulocytes, lymphocytes, macrophages, dendritic cells,) and neural cells.

A large amount of blood flows through the islets, 5–6 mL/min per 1 g of islet. It is up to 15 times more than in exocrine tissue of the pancreas.

Islets can influence each other through paracrine and autocrine communication, and beta cells are coupled electrically to six to seven other beta cells, but not to other cell types. Pancreatic islets are characterized by rich innervation and vascularization, although there are notable differences between rodent and human islets. Research indicates that the vascular density in human islets is about five times lower than in rodent islets. The vascular network within the islets resembles a glomeruli-like structure, consisting of highly fenestrated endothelial cells positioned closely to each endocrine cell. Consequently, the oxygen tension within pancreatic islets is significantly higher than that in the surrounding exocrine tissue.

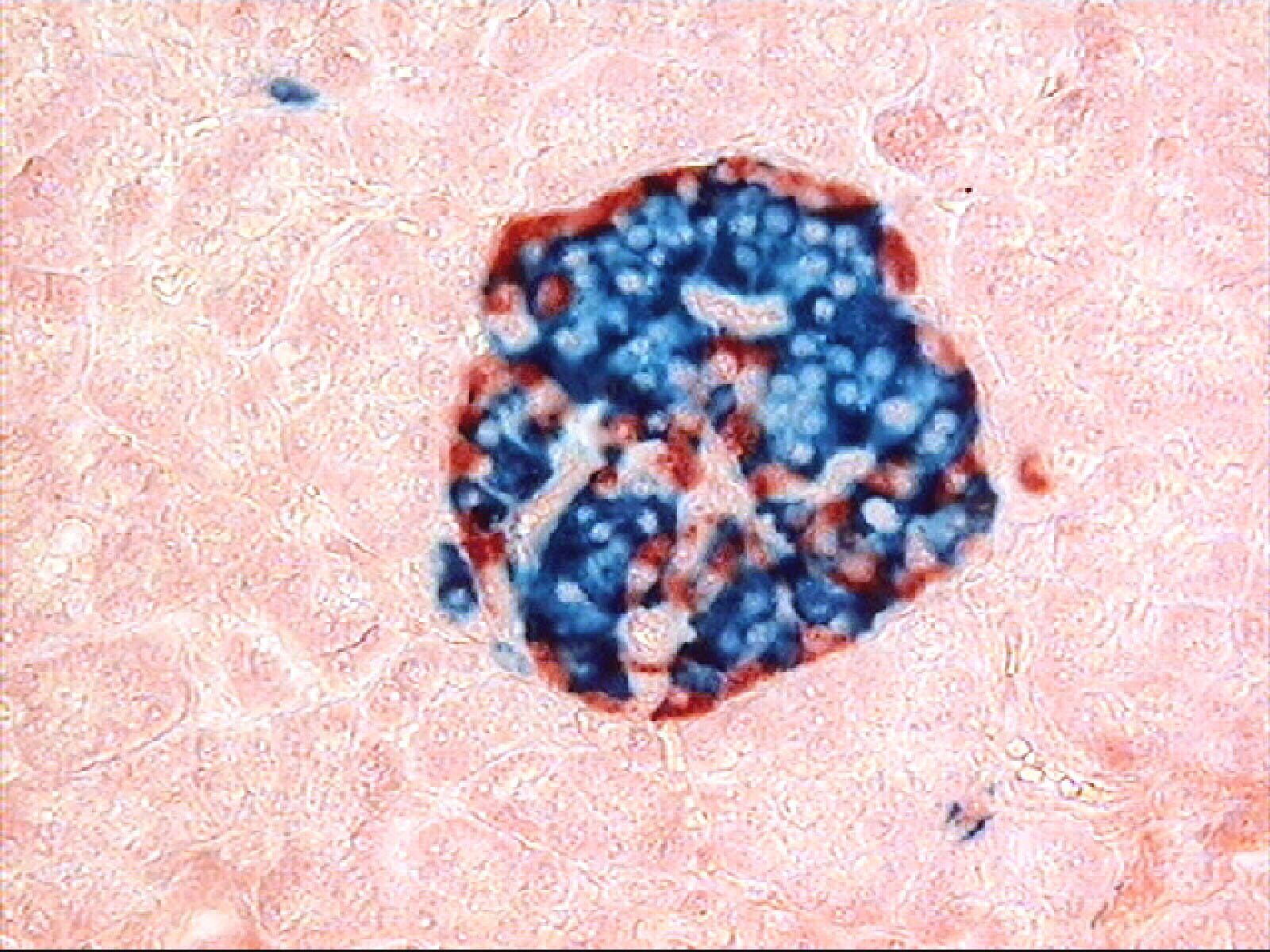
A pancreatic islet, stained.

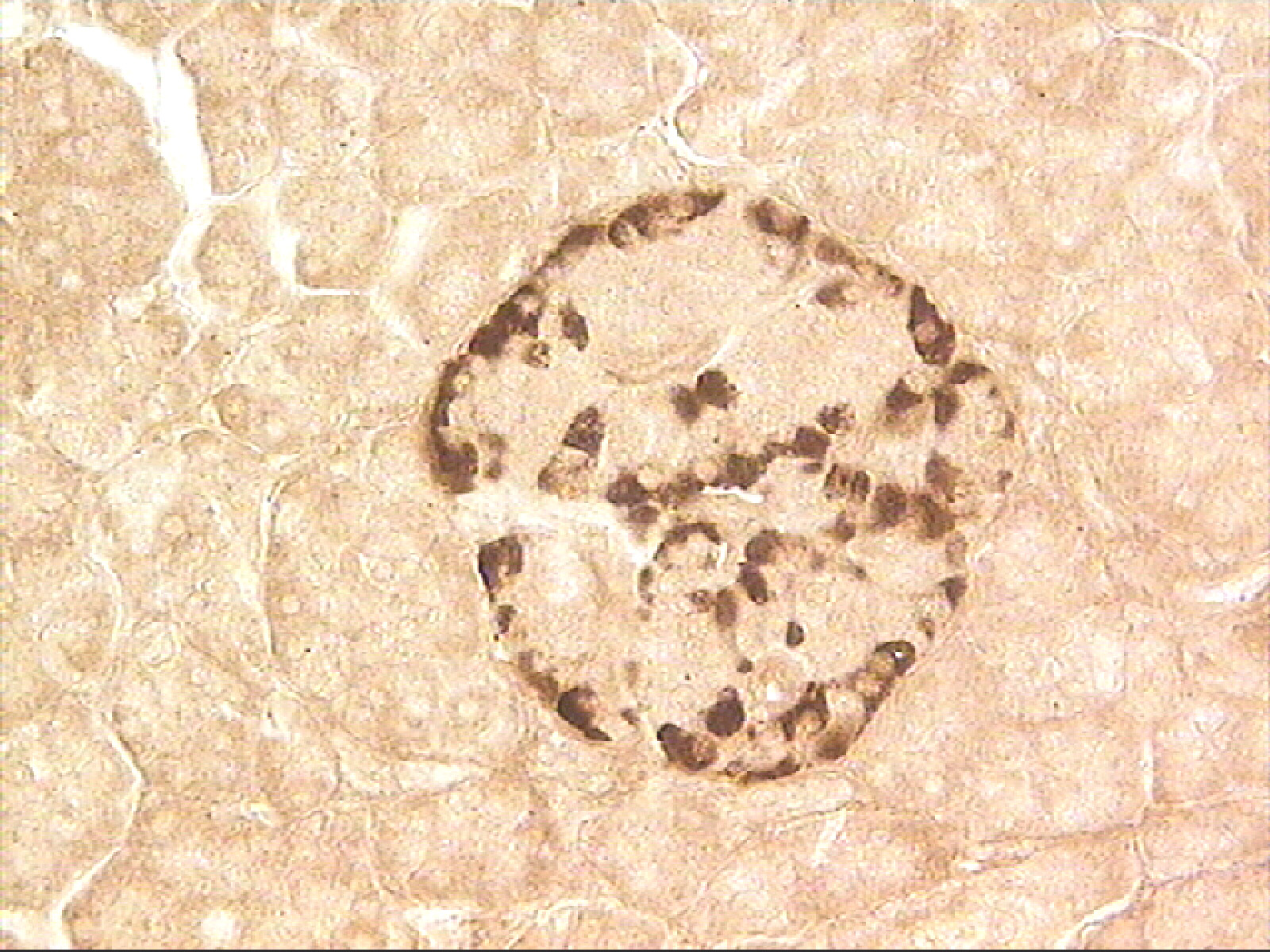
A pancreatic islet, showing alpha cells

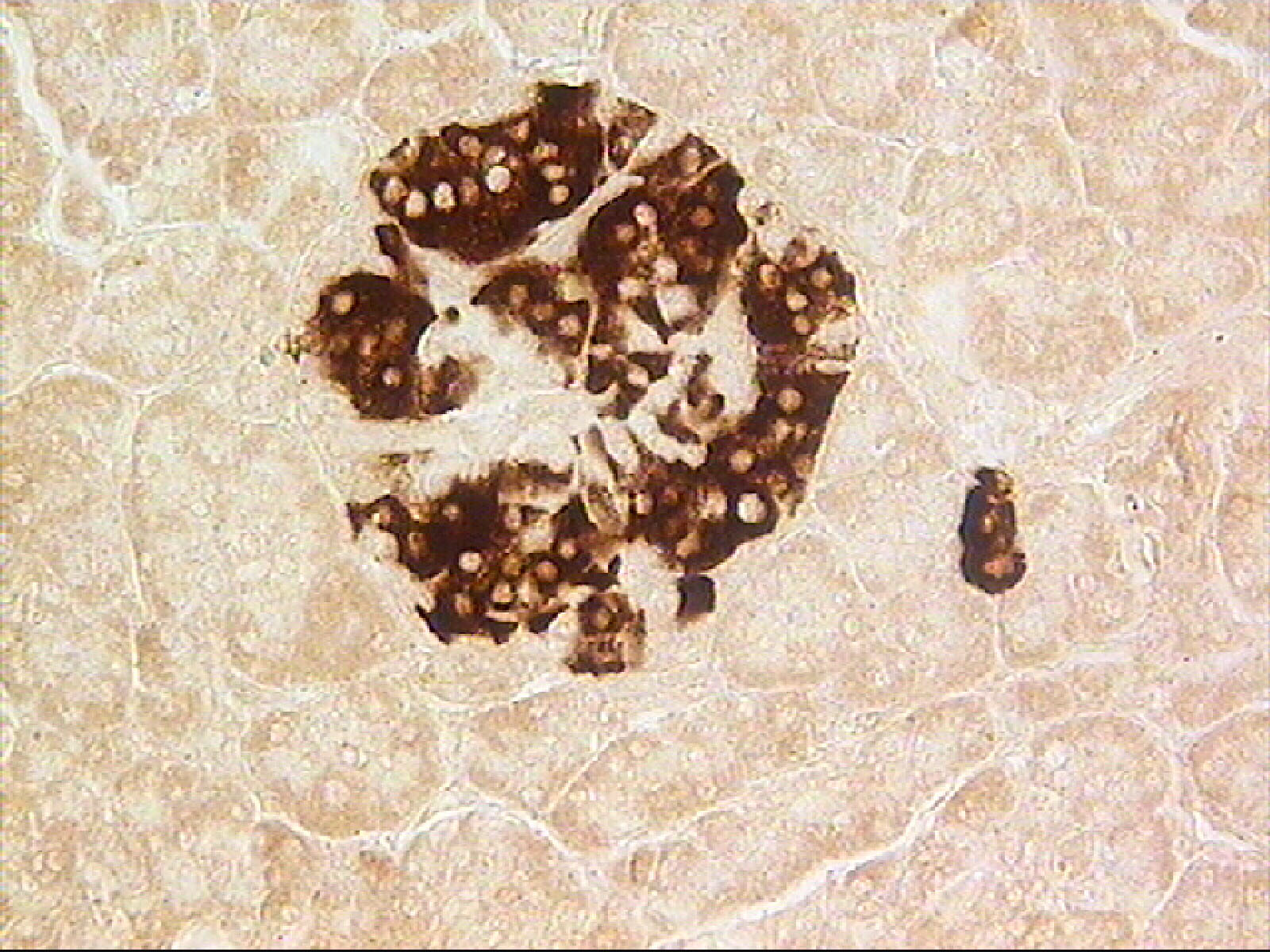
A pancreatic islet, showing beta cells.

== Function ==
The paracrine feedback system of the pancreatic islets has the following structure:

- High glucose: activates delta and beta cells, inhibits alpha cells.
- Low glucose: silences delta and beta cells, activates alpha cells.
- Glucagon: enhances glucose-induced secretion in beta cells.
- Insulin: indirectly (possibly, via delta cells) attenuates secretion in alpha cells.
- Somatostatin: inhibits alpha cells and beta cells. Also inhibits the secretion of pancreatic polypeptide.

A large number of G protein-coupled receptors (GPCRs) regulate the secretion of insulin, glucagon, and somatostatin from pancreatic islets, and some of these GPCRs are the targets of drugs used to treat type-2 diabetes (ref GLP-1 receptor agonists, DPPIV inhibitors).

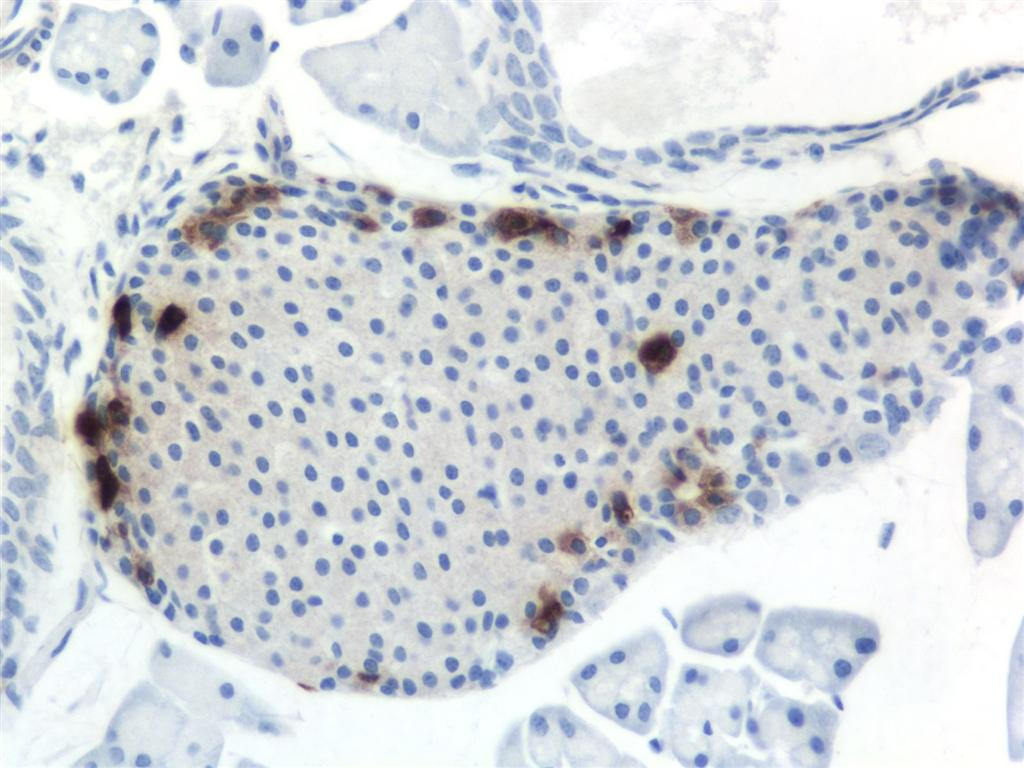
Mouse islet immunostained for pancreatic polypeptide

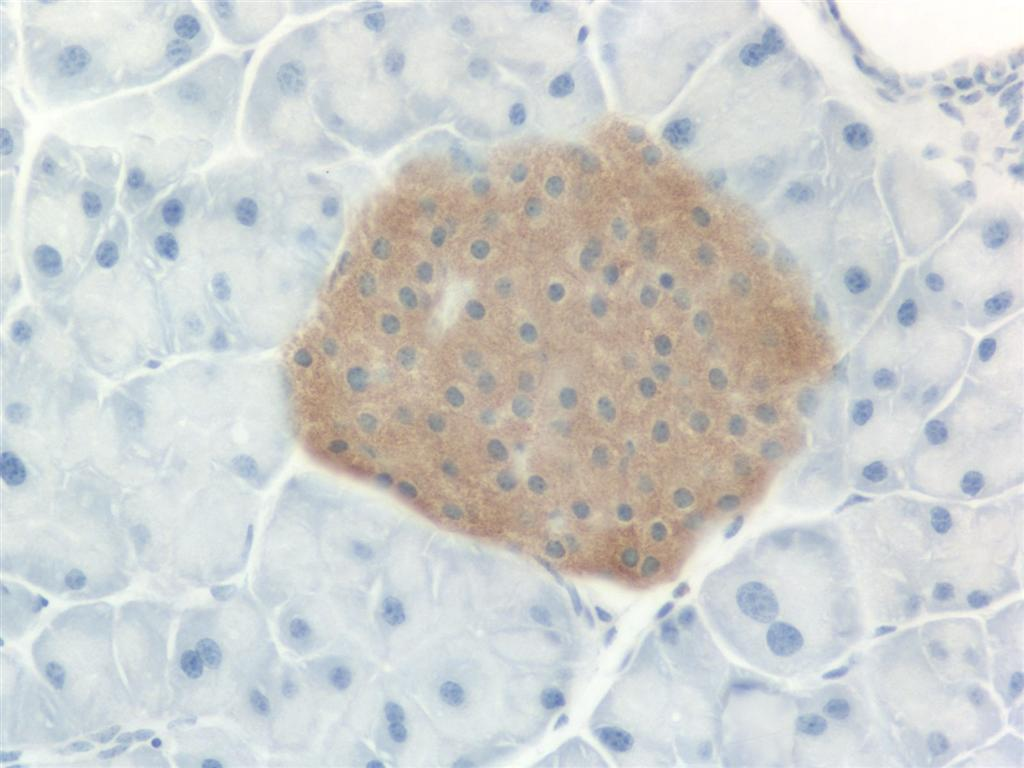
Mouse islet immunostained for insulin

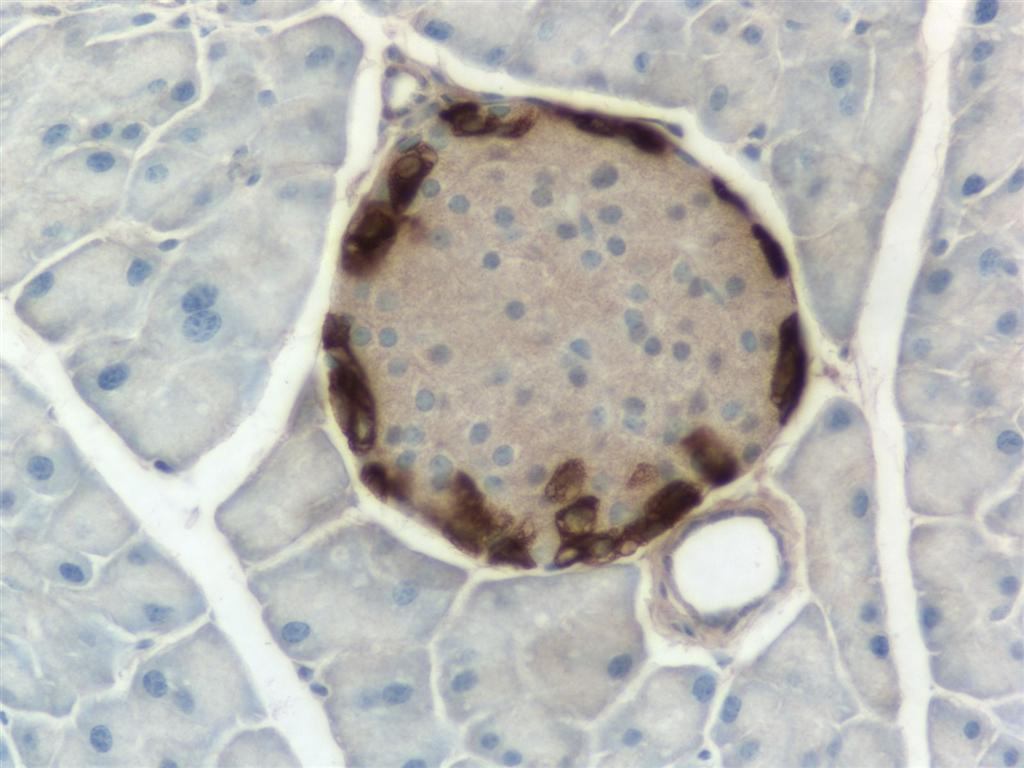
Mouse islet immunostained for glucagon

=== Electrical activity ===
Electrical activity of pancreatic islets has been studied using microelectrode and patch clamp techniques. It has turned out that the electrical behavior of cells in intact islets differs significantly from the behavior of dispersed cells.

== Clinical significance ==
=== Diabetes ===
The beta cells of the pancreatic islets secrete insulin, and so play a significant role in diabetes. It is thought that they are destroyed by immune assaults.

Because the beta cells in the pancreatic islets are selectively destroyed by an autoimmune process in type 1 diabetes, clinicians and researchers are actively pursuing islet transplantation as a means of restoring physiological beta cell function, which would offer an alternative to a complete pancreas transplant or artificial pancreas. Islet transplantation emerged as a viable option for the treatment of insulin requiring diabetes in the early 1970s with steady progress over the following three decades. Clinical trials as of 2008 have shown that insulin independence and improved metabolic control can be reproducibly obtained after transplantation of cadaveric donor islets into patients with unstable type 1 diabetes. Alternatively, daily insulin injections are an effective treatment for type 1 diabetes patients who are not candidates for islet transplantation.

People with high body mass index (BMI) are unsuitable pancreatic donors due to greater technical complications during transplantation. However, it is possible to isolate a larger number of islets because of their larger pancreas, and therefore they are more suitable donors of islets.

Islet transplantation only involves the transfer of tissue consisting of beta cells that are necessary as a treatment of this disease. It thus represents an advantage over whole pancreas transplantation, which is more technically demanding and poses a risk of, for example, pancreatitis leading to organ loss. Another advantage is that patients do not require general anesthesia.

Islet transplantation for type 1 diabetes (as of 2008) requires potent immunosuppression to prevent host rejection of donor islets.

The islets are transplanted into a portal vein, which is then implanted in the liver. There is a risk of portal venous branch thrombosis and the low value of islet survival a few minutes after transplantation, because the vascular density at this site is after the surgery several months lower than in endogenous islets. Thus, neovascularization is key to islet survival, that is supported, for example, by VEGF produced by islets and vascular endothelial cells. However, intraportal transplantation has some other shortcomings, and so other alternative sites that would provide better microenvironment for islets implantation are being examined. Islet transplant research also focuses on islet encapsulation, CNI-free (calcineurin-inhibitor) immunosuppression, biomarkers of islet damage or islet donor shortage.

An alternative source of beta cells, such insulin-producing cells derived from adult stem cells or progenitor cells would contribute to overcoming the shortage of donor organs for transplantation. The field of regenerative medicine is rapidly evolving and offers great hope for the nearest future. However, type 1 diabetes is the result of the autoimmune destruction of beta cells in the pancreas. Therefore, an effective cure will require a sequential, integrated approach that combines adequate and safe immune interventions with beta cell regenerative approaches. It has also been demonstrated that alpha cells can spontaneously switch fate and transdifferentiate into beta cells in both healthy and diabetic human and mouse pancreatic islets, a possible future source for beta cell regeneration. In fact, it has been found that islet morphology and endocrine differentiation are directly related. Endocrine progenitor cells differentiate by migrating in cohesion and forming bud-like islet precursors, or "peninsulas", in which alpha cells constitute the peninsular outer layer and beta cells form later beneath them. Cryopreservation has shown promise to improve the supply chain of pancreatic islets for better transplantation outcomes.

== Other animals ==
Extensive comparative anatomy work has been done to study the evolution of pancreatic islets across representatives of all major groups of vertebrates and a number of different invertebrates.

Islet organs are absent in any invertebrate and primitive chordates (tunicates and lancelets). During the evolution of vertebrates, the cell types secreting peptides related to insulin, somatostatin, glucagon, and PP moved from the brain to the gastrointestinal track mucosa (insulin first in tunicates, all four in lancelets), and then migrated out sequentially to form an islet structure (insulin and somatostatin first in jawless fish, followed by glucagon in jawed cartilaginous fish, few or no PP in lobe-finned bony fish, numerous PP in some ray-finned bony fish, ghrelin detected in catfish). In birds, other peptide-secreting cells such as IGF-1, PYY, and adrenomedullin have been localized in the islets.

Notably, American anglerfish pancreas — unlike those of mammals — has islets that are rich in endocrine cells and mostly free of pancreatic exocrine tissue, making them ideal sources of endocrine cells for research. It eventually enabled the isolation of the cDNA for preproglucagon, which contained the sequence for glucagon and two other glucagon-like peptides (GLP-1 and GLP-2).

== Research ==
Cannabinoid receptors are found widely expressed in islets of Langerhans, and several studies have investigated specific distribution and mechanisms of CB1 versus CB2 receptors in relation to pancreatic endocrine functions, where they play an important homeostatic role, as endocannabinoids modulate pancreatic β-cells function, proliferation, and survival, as well as insulin production, secretion, and resistance.

== Additional images ==
Pancreatic islets, the lighter tissue among the darker, acinar pancreatic tissue, hemalum-eosin stain.

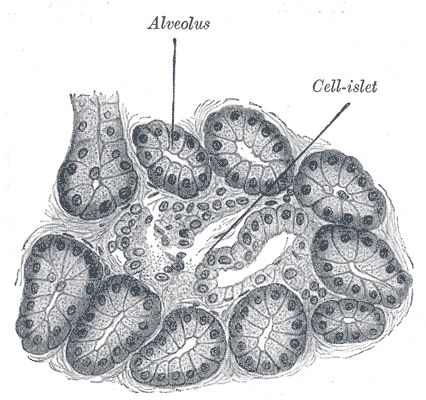
Illustration of dog pancreas. 250x.

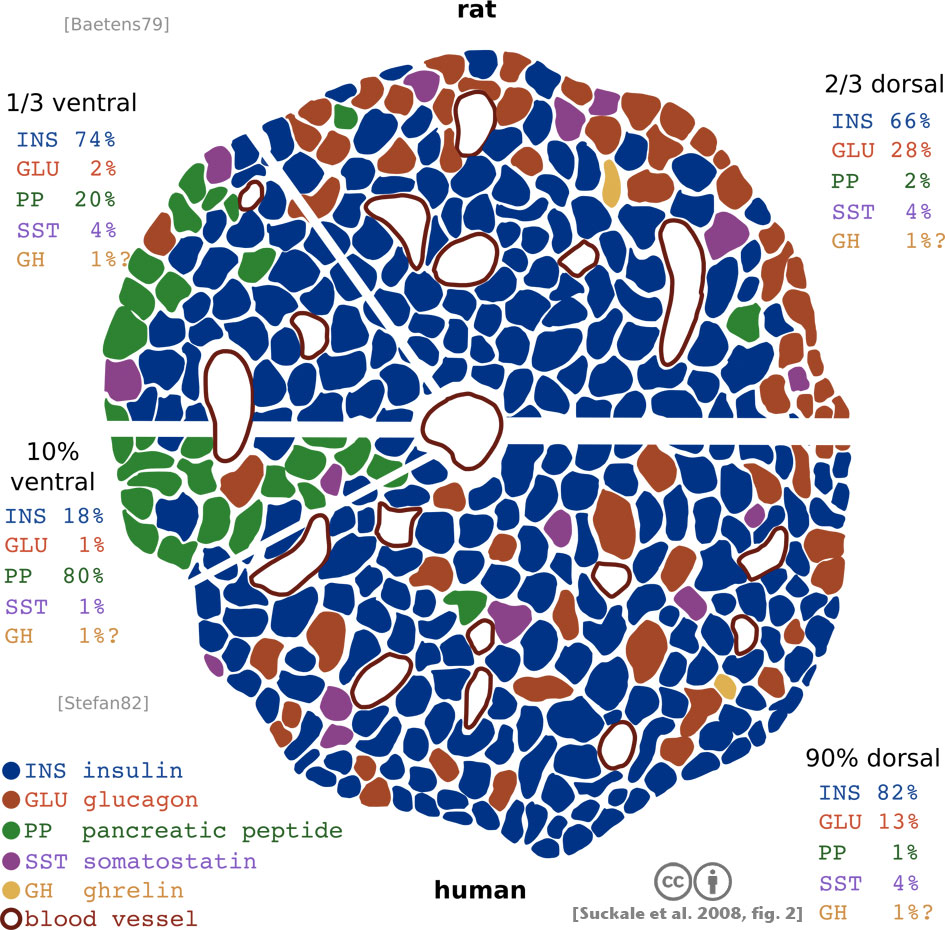
Structural differences between rat islets (top) and humans islets (bottom) as well as the ventral part (left) and the dorsal part (right) of the pancreas. Different cell types are colour-coded. Rodent islets, unlike the human ones, show the characteristic insulin core.

== See also ==
- Betatrophin
- Neuroendocrine tumor
- Pancreatic neuroendocrine tumor
- Adrift Just Off the Islets of Langerhans, a novelette by Harlan Ellison
