= Pancreatic polypeptide cells =

Pancreatic islet cell

Pancreatic polypeptide cells (PP cells), or formerly as gamma cells (γ-cells), or F cells, are cells in the pancreatic islets (Islets of Langerhans) of the pancreas. Their main role is to help synthesize and regulate the release of pancreatic polypeptide (PP), after which they have been named. The pancreatic islets, where PP cells reside, was discovered in 1869 by a German pathological anatomist and scientist, Paul Langerhans. PP cells help to make up the pancreas but are smallest in proportion to the other cells previously stated. The proportions can vary based on which animals are being studied, but in humans, PP cells make up less than 2% of the pancreatic islet cell population.

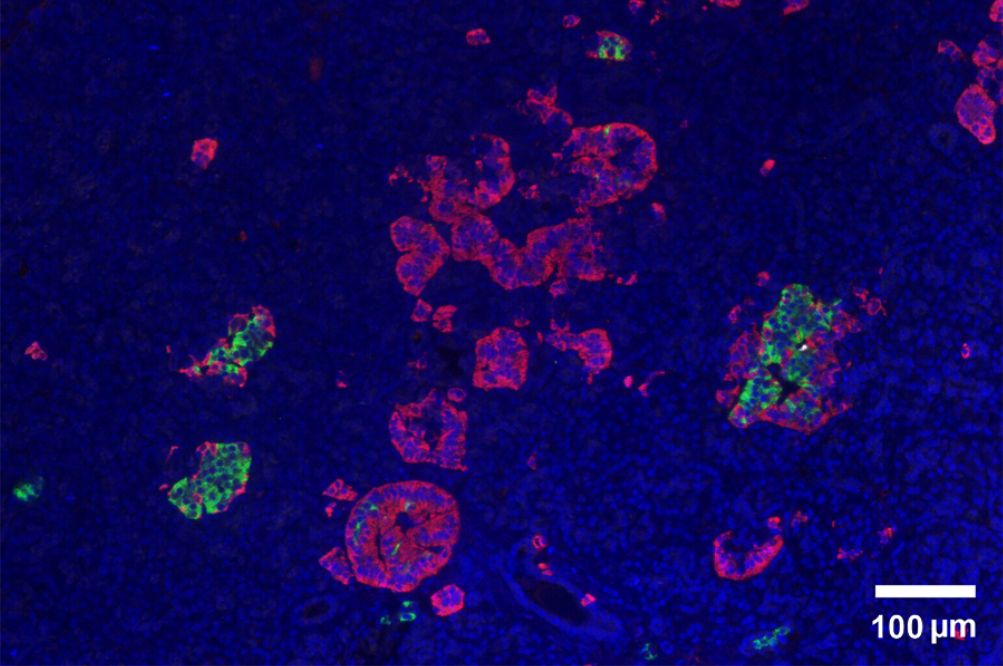
PP cell

== Structure and role ==
The pancreas serves multiple roles within mammalian organisms. It plays a role in the digestive system and the endocrine system making it an organ and a very important gland. PP cells tend to located in the pancreatic islets, and are one of the rarer pancreatic cell types. Some small clusters may also be found surrounded by exocrine pancreas. They tend to be located in the duodenal part of the pancreas more medially. Given their location in pancreatic islets along with their low population, they are able to respond efficiently to changes in blood sugar, nerve impulses, and chemical signaling through gap junctions or cellular signaling. PP cells show the highest concentration at the head of the pancreas.

PP cells play an important role when it comes to the regulation of plasma glucose as they help to synthesize and release pancreatic polypeptide (PP). As PP cells secrete more pancreatic polypeptide, it has been shown to have a negative effect on insulin secretion giving it anorexic effects on intestinal functionality. These cells have been shown to inhibit functions in the gut and decrease intestinal motor activity as well. In other words, as the secretion of pancreatic polypeptide increases, the secretion of insulin, a peptide hormone, starts to decrease. Pancreatic polypeptide also works to regulate glycogen levels and the amount of secreted substances from gastrointestinal cells and tissue. Within PP cells and its nucleus is the cellular DNA that allows for different proteins to be made that go on to play a role in cellular functions. PP cells are able to produce pancreatic polypeptide through transcription and translation of the PPY gene. Once it is produced, pancreatic polypeptide is shown to be a 36 amino acid long peptide that can be sent out to different areas within the pancreas or organism.

Pancreatic polypeptide cells are most active and secrete more pancreatic polypeptide after a meal with high protein, fasting, physical activity, and acute hypoglycemia. These same cells are inhibited by somatostatin, an inhibitory gastrointestinal hormone, and the presence of glucose.

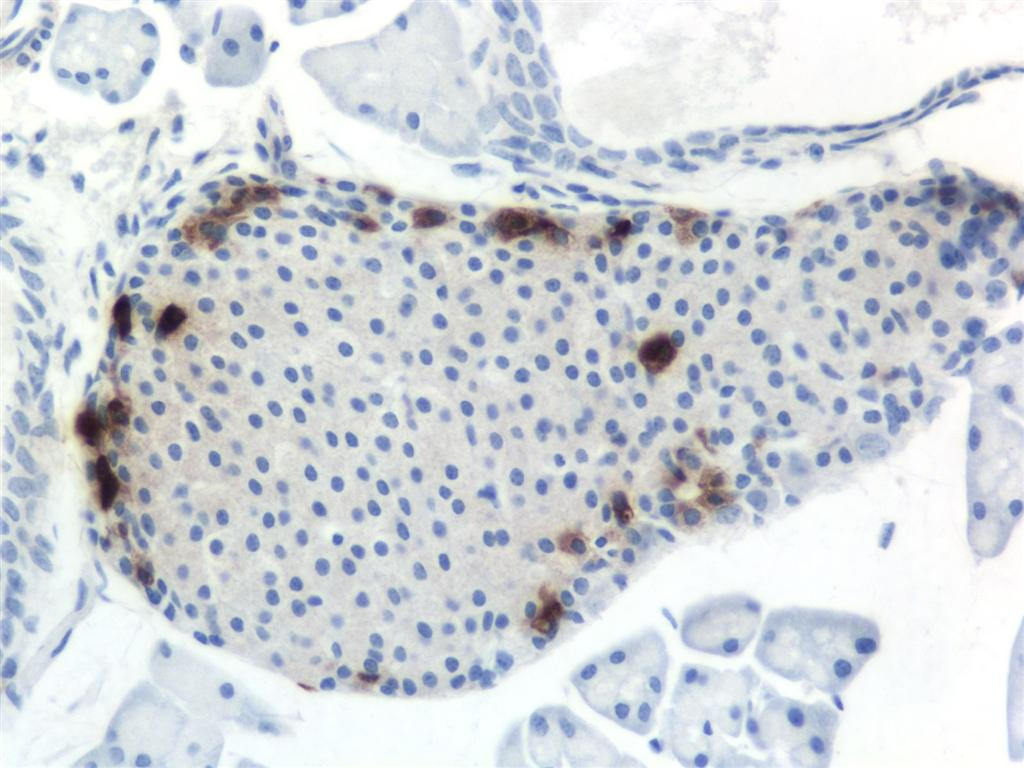
Pancreatic Polypeptide From a Mouse Cell

Through different microscopy techniques, the structural related details of PP cells have been able to be better understood. This is inclusive of how big they are, what their cellular membranes look like, the proteins associated with them, and even their size. PP cells are elongated cells. Another one of these details can be noted in insulins secretory granules, or container like buds, that store insulin within a cell. In PP cells, the size of the insulin granules are smaller and spherical and similar to those in alpha cells. This is noted in human PP cells, but different animals have been shown to have different sized granules compared to humans, like rodents. In cats and dogs, PP cells have large granules. In rats, PP cells have few granules, similar to humans. In dogs, some PP cells are located in the walls of the antrum of the stomach.

Pancreatic Islets

== Clinical significance ==
Pancreatic polypeptide cells are one of the most poorly understood cells in the pancreas. This is due to a number of reasons, but most notably due to its small proportion in relation to the other cells located in the pancreatic islets. Another reason that these cells are so poorly understood has to do with the difficulty in researching and analyzing these cells. Different studies conducted by various organizations and labs have all led to conflicting reports when trying to quantify PP cell populations in type 1 and type 2 diabetes due to the fact that these cells proliferate when there is damage to the pancreas.

Given that PP cells reside in the pancreas and serve both the digestive and endocrine systems, the roles it can play within a clinical setting are vast and important to analyze. Many of the applications geared around pancreatic polypeptide cells and the substances they secrete serve to better understand and treat diabetes better than it already is, and they have been heavily studied in rats. Studies are also being pursued to see how PP cells and the substances they release can help individuals who do not have a pancreas anymore due to various circumstances regulate insulin levels and maintain homeostasis. Other studies relating to PP cells have shown that these cells help to play a role in hunger for organisms. Another area of clinical research surrounding the pancreatic islets and PP cells is in regards to cellular communication. Currently, therapeutic strategies are being studied to help improve the communication between different cells in this pancreatic region by diving deeper into the cellular functions of these very cells and the regions they islet regions they reside in. The current studies being done mainly focus on diabetes and preventing the adverse effects it poses on mammalian organisms. The studies being done now focus heavily on the potential for stem-cell therapeutics or the development of different pharmaceuticals to help limit this condition.

== See also ==
List of distinct cell types in the adult human body
