= Neuropeptide Y receptor type 4 =

Protein-coding gene in the species Homo sapiens

NPY4R

Identifiers
- Aliases: NPY4R, NPY4-R, PP1, PPYR1, Y4, Pancreatic polypeptide receptor 1, neuropeptide Y receptor Y4
- External IDs: OMIM: 601790; MGI: 105374; GeneCards: NPY4R

Gene location (Human)
Chr.	Chromosome 10 (human)
Band	10q11.22	Start	46,461,099 bp
Band	10q11.22	End	46,465,958 bp

Gene location (Mouse)
Chr.	Chromosome 14 (mouse)
Band	14 B|14 20.8 cM	Start	33,865,949 bp
Band	14 B|14 20.8 cM	End	33,874,446 bp
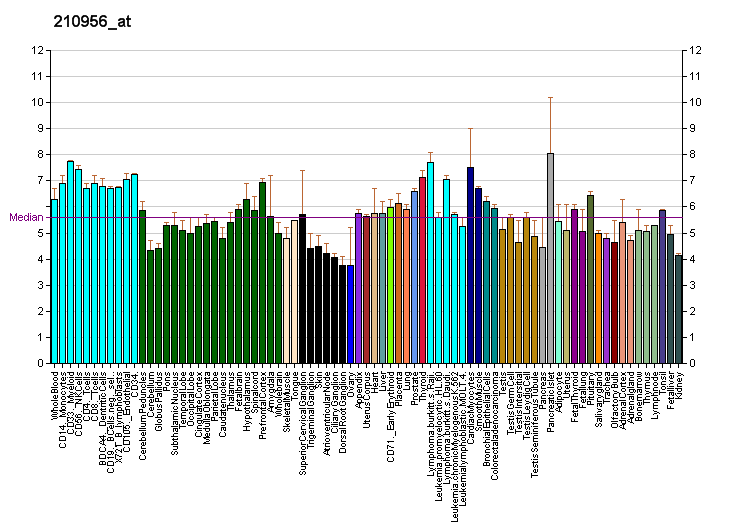
RNA expression pattern
Bgee	Human / Mouse (ortholog); Top expressed in: rectum; transverse colon; muscle layer of sigmoid colon; duodenum; mucosa of transverse colon; smooth muscle tissue; skin of abdomen; skin of leg; appendix; stomach / Top expressed in: embryo; lip; urinary bladder; digastric muscle; stomach; duodenum; lumbar spinal ganglion; jejunum; ileum; submandibular gland; More reference expression data
BioGPS	More reference expression data
Gene ontology
Molecular function	neuropeptide Y receptor activity; G protein-coupled receptor activity; signal transducer activity; pancreatic polypeptide receptor activity; peptide hormone binding
Cellular component	integral component of membrane; plasma membrane; integral component of plasma membrane; membrane
Biological process	signal transduction; neuropeptide signaling pathway; chemical synaptic transmission; G protein-coupled receptor signaling pathway
Sources:Amigo / QuickGO
Orthologs
Databases	NCBI: entry; OMA: entry
Species	Human	Mouse
Entrez	5540	19065
Ensembl	ENSG00000204174	ENSMUSG00000048337
UniProt	P0DQD5; P50391	Q61041
RefSeq (mRNA)	NM_001278794; NM_005972	NM_008919
RefSeq (protein)	NP_001265724; NP_001265723; NP_005963; NP_001265724	NP_032945
Location (UCSC)	Chr 10: 46.46 – 46.47 Mb	Chr 14: 33.87 – 33.87 Mb
PubMed search
- Wikidata
View/Edit Human	View/Edit Mouse

Neuropeptide Y receptor type 4, also known as Pancreatic polypeptide receptor 1 (PPYR1), is a protein that in humans is encoded by the NPY4R gene.

== Selective Ligands ==
=== Agonists ===
- Pancreatic polypeptide
- Neuropeptide Y (endogenous agonist, non subtype selective)
- Peptide YY
- GR-231,118 (mixed NPY_{1} antagonist / NPY_{4} agonist, CAS# 158859–98–4)

=== Antagonists ===
- UR-AK49

== See also ==
- Neuropeptide Y receptor
