= Antianalgesia =

Antianalgesia is the ability of some endogenous chemicals (notably cholecystokinin and neuropeptide Y) to counter the effects of exogenous analgesics (such as morphine) or endogenous pain inhibiting neurotransmitters/modulators, such as the endogenous opioids. A learned form can be established using methods similar to the learning principle of conditioned inhibition, and has been demonstrated in rats.
