= 6Y =

6Y or 6-Y may refer to:

- 6 years
- 6Y, the call sign prefix for radio stations in Jamaica
- 6Y, Aircraft registration for Jamaica
- 6Y, the IATA airline code for the Latvian company SmartLynx Airlines
- 6Y, a model of Škoda Fabia engine
- 6Y, the production code for the 1985 Doctor Who serial Timelash

== See also ==
- Y6 (disambiguation)
