= BIIE-0246 =

Chemical compound

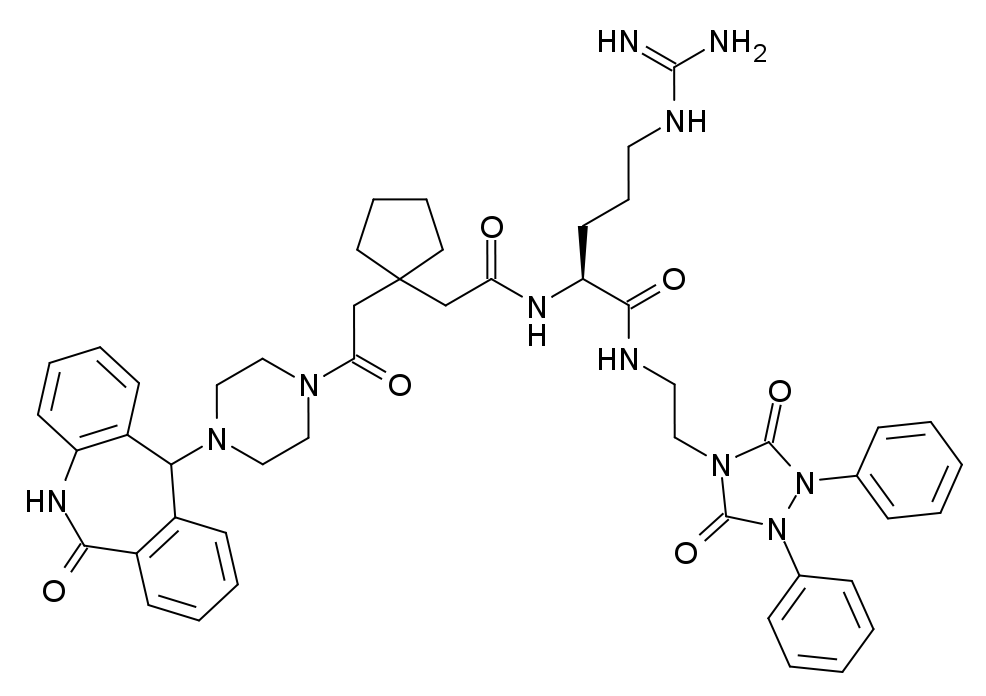

Clinical data
- Other names: BIIE-0246

Identifiers
- IUPAC name: N-[(1S)-4-[(Aminoiminomethyl)amino]-1-[([2-(3,5-dioxo-1,2-diphenyl-1,2,4-triazolidin-4-yl)ethyl]amino)carbonyl]butyl]-1-(2-[4-(6,11-dihydro-6-oxo-5H-dibenz[b,e]azepin-11-yl)-1-piperazinyl]-2-oxoethyl)cyclopentaneacetamide
- CAS Number: 246146-55-4
- PubChem CID: 9811493
- IUPHAR/BPS: 1547
- ChemSpider: 7987248
- UNII: N3Z657H81X
- CompTox Dashboard (EPA): DTXSID40179360

Chemical and physical data
- Formula: C_{49}H_{57}N_{11}O_{6}
- Molar mass: 896.066 g·mol^{−1}
- 3D model (JSmol): Interactive image
- SMILES: O=C3N(c1ccccc1)N(c2ccccc2)C(=O)N3CCNC(=O)[C@@H](NC(=O)CC4(CCCC4)CC(=O)N8CCN(C7c5c(cccc5)NC(=O)c6ccccc67)CC8)CCC/N=C(\N)N
- InChI: InChI=1S/C49H57N11O6/c50-46(51)53-25-13-22-40(45(64)52-26-27-58-47(65)59(34-14-3-1-4-15-34)60(48(58)66)35-16-5-2-6-17-35)54-41(61)32-49(23-11-12-24-49)33-42(62)56-28-30-57(31-29-56)43-36-18-7-8-19-37(36)44(63)55-39-21-10-9-20-38(39)43/h1-10,14-21,40,43H,11-13,22-33H2,(H,52,64)(H,54,61)(H,55,63)(H4,50,51,53)/t40-,43?/m0/s1; Key:RSJAXPUYVJKAAA-JPGJPTAESA-N

BIIE-0246 is a drug used in scientific research which acts as a potent and selective antagonist for the Neuropeptide Y receptor Y_{2}. It was one of the first non-peptide Y_{2}-selective antagonists developed, and remains among the most widely used tools for studying this receptor. It has been used to demonstrate a role for the Y_{2} subtype as a presynaptic autoreceptor limiting further neuropeptide Y release, as well as modulating dopamine and acetylcholine release. It has also been shown to produce several behavioural effects in animals, including reducing alcohol consumption in addicted rats and anxiolytic effects, although while selective Y_{2} agonists are expected to be useful as anorectics, BIIE-0246 did not appear to increase appetite when administered alone.
