= Neuropeptide Y receptor type 2 =

Protein-coding gene in the species Homo sapiens

NPY2R

Identifiers
- Aliases: NPY2R, NPY2-R, Neuropeptide Y receptor Y2
- External IDs: OMIM: 162642; MGI: 108418; GeneCards: NPY2R
Available structures
PDB	Ortholog search: PDBe RCSB
PDB	List of PDB id codes 2IK3

Gene location (Human)
Chr.	Chromosome 4 (human)
Band	4q32.1	Start	155,208,636 bp
Band	4q32.1	End	155,217,078 bp

Gene location (Mouse)
Chr.	Chromosome 3 (mouse)
Band	3 E3|3 36.49 cM	Start	82,445,690 bp
Band	3 E3|3 36.49 cM	End	82,455,391 bp
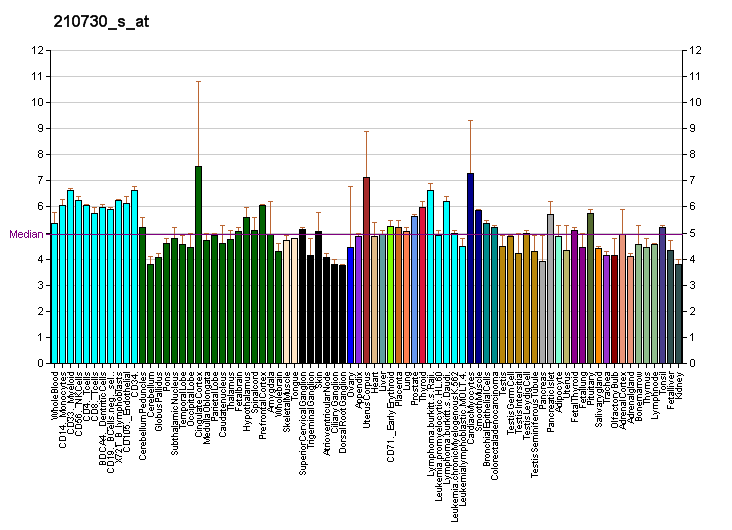

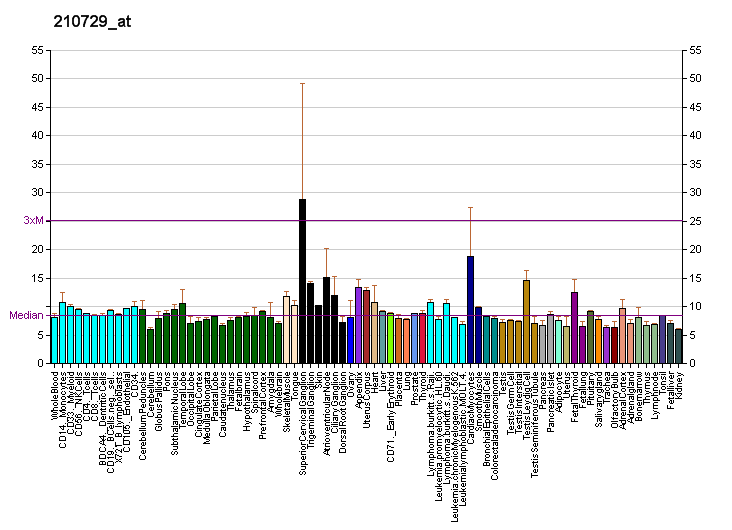
RNA expression pattern
Bgee	Human / Mouse (ortholog); Top expressed in: testicle; optic nerve; pancreatic ductal cell; lactiferous duct; prefrontal cortex; hypothalamus; tibialis anterior muscle; nucleus accumbens; right coronary artery; Brodmann area 9 / Top expressed in: median eminence; lumbar spinal ganglion; arcuate nucleus; dentate gyrus of hippocampal formation granule cell; hippocampus proper; anterior amygdaloid area; subiculum; CA3 field; globus pallidus; area postrema; More reference expression data
BioGPS	More reference expression data
Gene ontology
Molecular function	neuropeptide Y receptor activity; G protein-coupled receptor activity; calcium channel regulator activity; signal transducer activity; protein binding; peptide YY receptor activity; signaling receptor activity
Cellular component	integral component of membrane; membrane; plasma membrane; integral component of plasma membrane; intracellular anatomical structure; non-motile cilium; cilium
Biological process	adenylate cyclase-inhibiting G protein-coupled receptor signaling pathway; regulation of sensory perception of pain; locomotory behavior; positive regulation of cytosolic calcium ion concentration; positive regulation of peptide secretion; outflow tract morphogenesis; cardiac left ventricle morphogenesis; negative regulation of nervous system process; negative regulation of synaptic transmission; behavioral fear response; negative regulation of excitatory postsynaptic potential; secretion; positive regulation of circadian sleep/wake cycle, non-REM sleep; positive regulation of dopamine secretion; negative regulation of secretion; feeding behavior; negative regulation of feeding behavior; nitric oxide mediated signal transduction; neuropeptide signaling pathway; positive regulation of smooth muscle contraction; negative regulation of synaptic transmission, glutamatergic; signal transduction; positive regulation of cell-substrate adhesion; ageing; chemical synaptic transmission; G protein-coupled receptor signaling pathway; negative regulation of cAMP-mediated signaling
Sources:Amigo / QuickGO
Orthologs
Databases	NCBI: entry; OMA: entry
Species	Human	Mouse
Entrez	4887	18167
Ensembl	ENSG00000185149	ENSMUSG00000028004
UniProt	P49146	P97295
RefSeq (mRNA)	NM_000910; NM_001370180; NM_001375470	NM_001205099; NM_008731
RefSeq (protein)	NP_000901; NP_001357109; NP_001362399	NP_001192028; NP_032757
Location (UCSC)	Chr 4: 155.21 – 155.22 Mb	Chr 3: 82.45 – 82.46 Mb
PubMed search
- Wikidata
View/Edit Human	View/Edit Mouse

Neuropeptide Y receptor type 2 (Y2R) is a member of the neuropeptide Y receptor family of G-protein coupled receptors, that in humans is encoded by the NPY2R gene.

== Selective ligands ==
=== Agonists ===
- Neuropeptide Y (endogenous agonist, non subtype selective)
- Neuropeptide Y fragment 13-36 (NPY_{2} selective agonist)
- Peptide YY
- Peptide YY 3-36 fragment

=== Antagonists ===
- BIIE-0246 (CAS# 246146-55-4)
- JNJ 5207787 (CAS# 683746-68-1)
- SF 11 (CAS# 443292-81-7)

== See also ==
- Neuropeptide Y receptor
