= Neuropeptide Y receptor type 1 =

Protein-coding gene in the species Homo sapiens

NPY1R
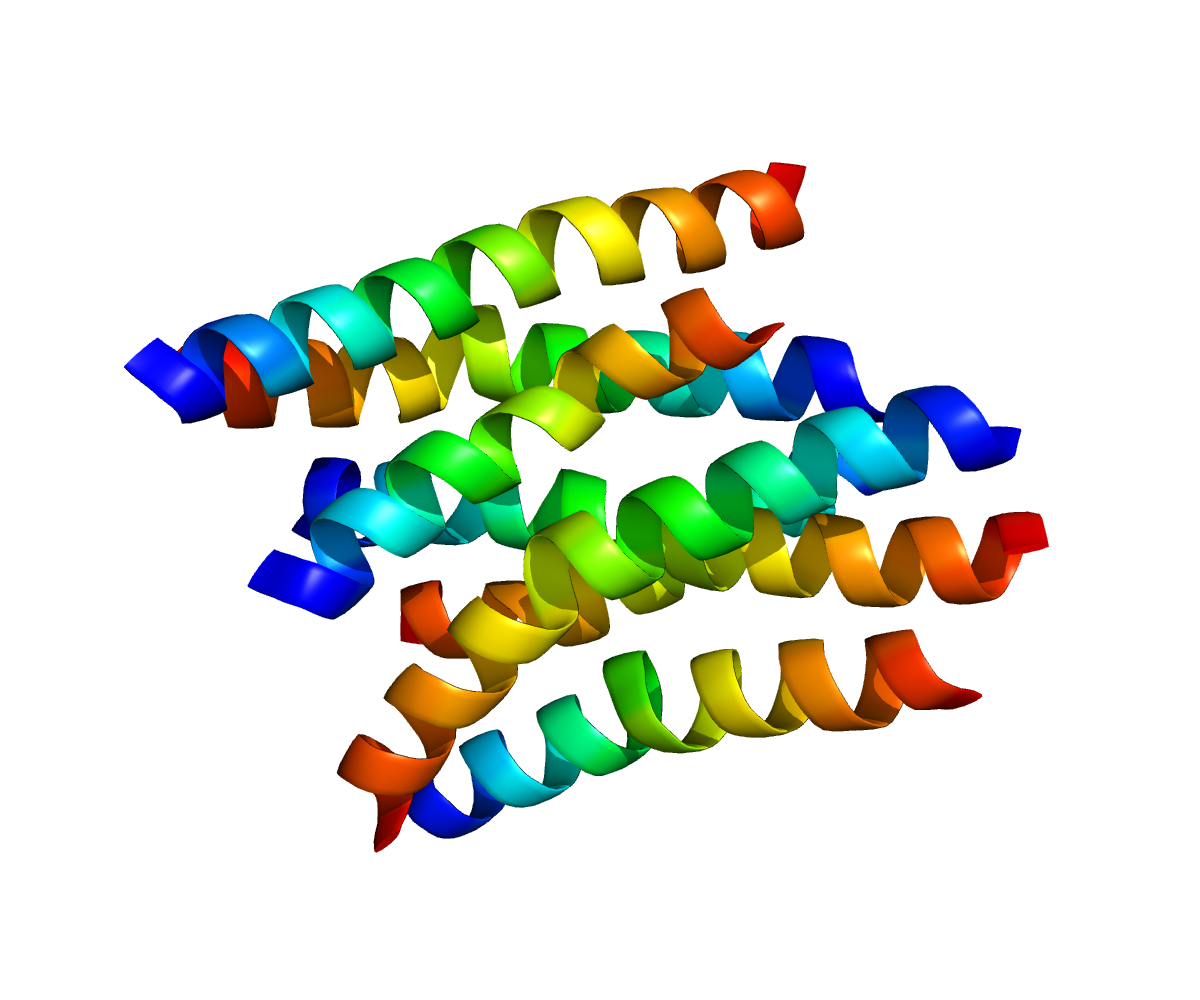

Identifiers
- Aliases: NPY1R, NPY1-R, NPYR, Neuropeptide Y receptor Y1
- External IDs: OMIM: 162641; MGI: 104963; GeneCards: NPY1R
Available structures
PDB	Ortholog search: PDBe RCSB
PDB	List of PDB id codes 2F1U, 2IIL

Gene location (Human)
Chr.	Chromosome 4 (human)
Band	4q32.2	Start	163,323,962 bp
Band	4q32.2	End	163,344,832 bp

Gene location (Mouse)
Chr.	Chromosome 8 (mouse)
Band	8 B3.1|8 33.15 cM	Start	67,149,844 bp
Band	8 B3.1|8 33.15 cM	End	67,159,444 bp
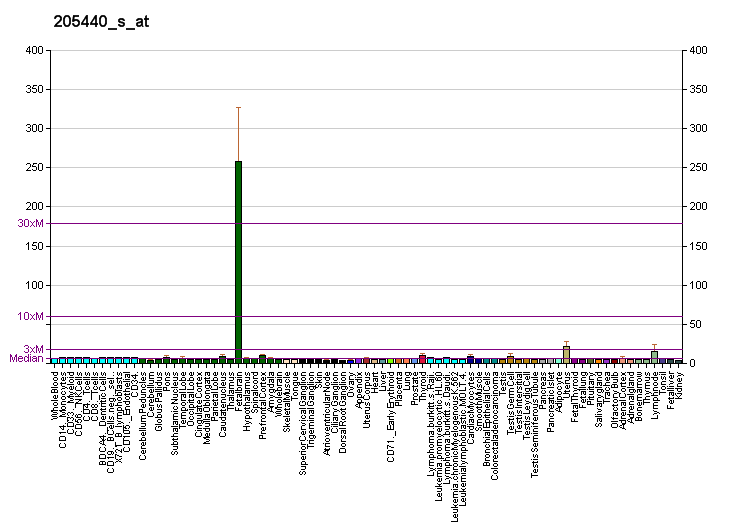
RNA expression pattern
Bgee	Human / Mouse (ortholog); Top expressed in: spleen; popliteal artery; tibial arteries; right adrenal cortex; left adrenal cortex; Descending thoracic aorta; adipose tissue; germinal epithelium; superficial temporal artery; subcutaneous adipose tissue / Top expressed in: ascending aorta; aortic valve; dentate gyrus of hippocampal formation granule cell; superior frontal gyrus; primary visual cortex; trigeminal ganglion; muscle of thigh; hippocampus proper; posterior horn of spinal cord; spinal ganglia; More reference expression data
BioGPS	More reference expression data
Gene ontology
Molecular function	neuropeptide Y receptor activity; G protein-coupled receptor activity; signal transducer activity; protein binding; peptide YY receptor activity; pancreatic polypeptide receptor activity
Cellular component	integral component of membrane; membrane; plasma membrane; integral component of plasma membrane
Biological process	adenylate cyclase-inhibiting G protein-coupled receptor signaling pathway; locomotory behavior; regulation of multicellular organism growth; G protein-coupled receptor signaling pathway, coupled to cyclic nucleotide second messenger; outflow tract morphogenesis; blood circulation; regulation of blood pressure; feeding behavior; glucose metabolic process; sensory perception of pain; neuropeptide signaling pathway; signal transduction; chemical synaptic transmission; G protein-coupled receptor signaling pathway
Sources:Amigo / QuickGO
Orthologs
Databases	NCBI: entry; OMA: entry
Species	Human	Mouse
Entrez	4886	18166
Ensembl	ENSG00000164128	ENSMUSG00000036437
UniProt	P25929	Q04573
RefSeq (mRNA)	NM_000909	NM_010934; NM_001358955
RefSeq (protein)	NP_000900	NP_035064; NP_001345884
Location (UCSC)	Chr 4: 163.32 – 163.34 Mb	Chr 8: 67.15 – 67.16 Mb
PubMed search
- Wikidata
View/Edit Human	View/Edit Mouse

Neuropeptide Y receptor type 1 is a protein that in humans is encoded by the NPY1R gene.

== Selective ligands ==
=== Agonists ===
- Neuropeptide Y (endogenous agonist, non subtype selective)
- Peptide YY

=== Antagonists ===
Peptide

- BVD-10 (selective NPY_{1} antagonist, CAS# 262418-00-8)
- GR-231,118 (mixed NPY_{1} antagonist / NPY_{4} agonist, CAS# 158859-98-4)

Non-peptide

- BIBO-3304 (CAS# 191868-14-1)
- BIBP-3226 (CAS# 159013-54-4)
- PD-160,170 (CAS# 181468-88-2)

== Available Structures ==
- 5ZBH (Neuropeptide Y1 bound to antagonist BMS-193835)
- 5ZBQ (Neuropeptide Y1 bound to antagonist UR-MK299)

== See also ==
- Neuropeptide Y receptor
