= Neuropeptide Y receptor type 6 =

Pseudogene in the species Homo sapiens

An Error has occurred retrieving Wikidata item for infobox Putative neuropeptide Y receptor type 6 is a protein that in humans is encoded by the NPY6R gene.
