= Neuropeptide B/W receptor =

G-protein coupled receptor

neuropeptides B/W receptor 1

Identifiers
- Symbol: NPBWR1
- Alt. symbols: GPR7
- NCBI gene: 2831
- HGNC: 4522
- OMIM: 600730
- RefSeq: NM_005285
- UniProt: P48145

Other data
- Locus: Chr. 8 p22-q21.13
Search for
- Structures: Swiss-model
- Domains: InterPro

neuropeptides B/W receptor 2

Identifiers
- Symbol: NPBWR2
- Alt. symbols: GPR8
- NCBI gene: 2832
- HGNC: 4530
- OMIM: 600731
- RefSeq: NM_005286
- UniProt: P48146

Other data
- Locus: Chr. 20 q13.3
Search for
- Structures: Swiss-model
- Domains: InterPro

The neuropeptide B/W receptors are members of the G-protein coupled receptor superfamily of integral membrane proteins which bind the neuropeptides B and W. These receptors are predominantly expressed in the CNS and have a number of functions including regulation of the secretion of cortisol.
