= Neuropeptides B/W receptor 1 =

Protein-coding gene in the species Homo sapiens

NPBWR1

Identifiers
- Aliases: NPBWR1, GPR7, Neuropeptides B/W receptor 1, neuropeptides B and W receptor 1
- External IDs: OMIM: 600730; MGI: 891989; GeneCards: NPBWR1

Gene location (Human)
Chr.	Chromosome 8 (human)
Band	8q11.23	Start	52,939,182 bp
Band	8q11.23	End	52,943,734 bp

Gene location (Mouse)
Chr.	Chromosome 1 (mouse)
Band	1|1 A1	Start	5,983,926 bp
Band	1|1 A1	End	5,987,617 bp
RNA expression pattern
Bgee	Human / Mouse (ortholog); Top expressed in: testicle; gonad; gallbladder; olfactory zone of nasal mucosa; prefrontal cortex; right lobe of liver; cingulate gyrus; anterior cingulate cortex; Brodmann area 9; hypothalamus / Top expressed in: embryo; lip; hypothalamus; hippocampus proper; dentate gyrus of hippocampal formation granule cell; zone of skin; tail of embryo; superior frontal gyrus; primary visual cortex; genital tubercle; More reference expression data
BioGPS	n/a
Gene ontology
Molecular function	G protein-coupled opioid receptor activity; neuropeptide binding; protein binding; G protein-coupled receptor activity; signal transducer activity; neuropeptide receptor activity; peptide binding
Cellular component	integral component of membrane; neuron projection; plasma membrane; integral component of plasma membrane; membrane
Biological process	G protein-coupled receptor signaling pathway, coupled to cyclic nucleotide second messenger; regulation of metabolic process; neuropeptide signaling pathway; signal transduction; chemical synaptic transmission; G protein-coupled opioid receptor signaling pathway; G protein-coupled receptor signaling pathway
Sources:Amigo / QuickGO
Orthologs
Databases	NCBI: entry; OMA: entry
Species	Human	Mouse
Entrez	2831	226304
Ensembl	ENSG00000288611	ENSMUSG00000033774
UniProt	P48145	P49681
RefSeq (mRNA)	NM_005285	NM_010342
RefSeq (protein)	NP_005276	NP_034472
Location (UCSC)	Chr 8: 52.94 – 52.94 Mb	Chr 1: 5.98 – 5.99 Mb
PubMed search
- Wikidata
View/Edit Human	View/Edit Mouse

Neuropeptides B/W receptor 1, also known as NPBW1 and formerly as GPR7, is a human protein encoded by the NPBWR1 gene. As implied by its name, it and related gene NPBW2 (with which it shares 70% nucleotide identity) are transmembranes protein that bind Neuropeptide B (NPB) and Neuropeptide W (NPW), both proteins expressed strongly in parts of the brain that regulate stress and fear including the extended amygdala and stria terminalis. When originally discovered in 1995, these receptors had no known ligands ("orphan receptors") and were called GPR7 and GPR8, but at least three groups in the early 2000s independently identified their endogenous ligands, triggering the name change in 2005.

== Structure ==
NPBW1 has seven transmembrane domains, which it unsurprisingly shares with NPBWR2, but also a family of somatostatin and opioid receptors, and like these proteins couple to Gi-class G proteins.

== Functions ==
In rodent models, NPBWR1 is over-expressed in Schwann cells associated with neuropathic pain, suggesting it inhibits inflammatory pain responses. Mice without NPBW1 exhibited a stronger hostile reaction to intruders, suggesting NPBW1 has a role in stress responses. Early studies indicated that NPB and NPW had a complex effect on appetite, but generally led to anorexia. Similarly, male rats lacking NPBWR1 exhibited hyperphagia and adult-onset obesity, though why female rats are unaffected is unknown. Researchers speculated that activating these pathways might decrease obesity, and synthesized a small-molecule ligand that is capable of stimulating both receptors at low concentrations.

== Ligands ==
Agonists

- Neuropeptide B
- Neuropeptide W

Antagonists

- CYM50769
