= Pancreatic polypeptide =

Hormone produced by the pancreas

PPY
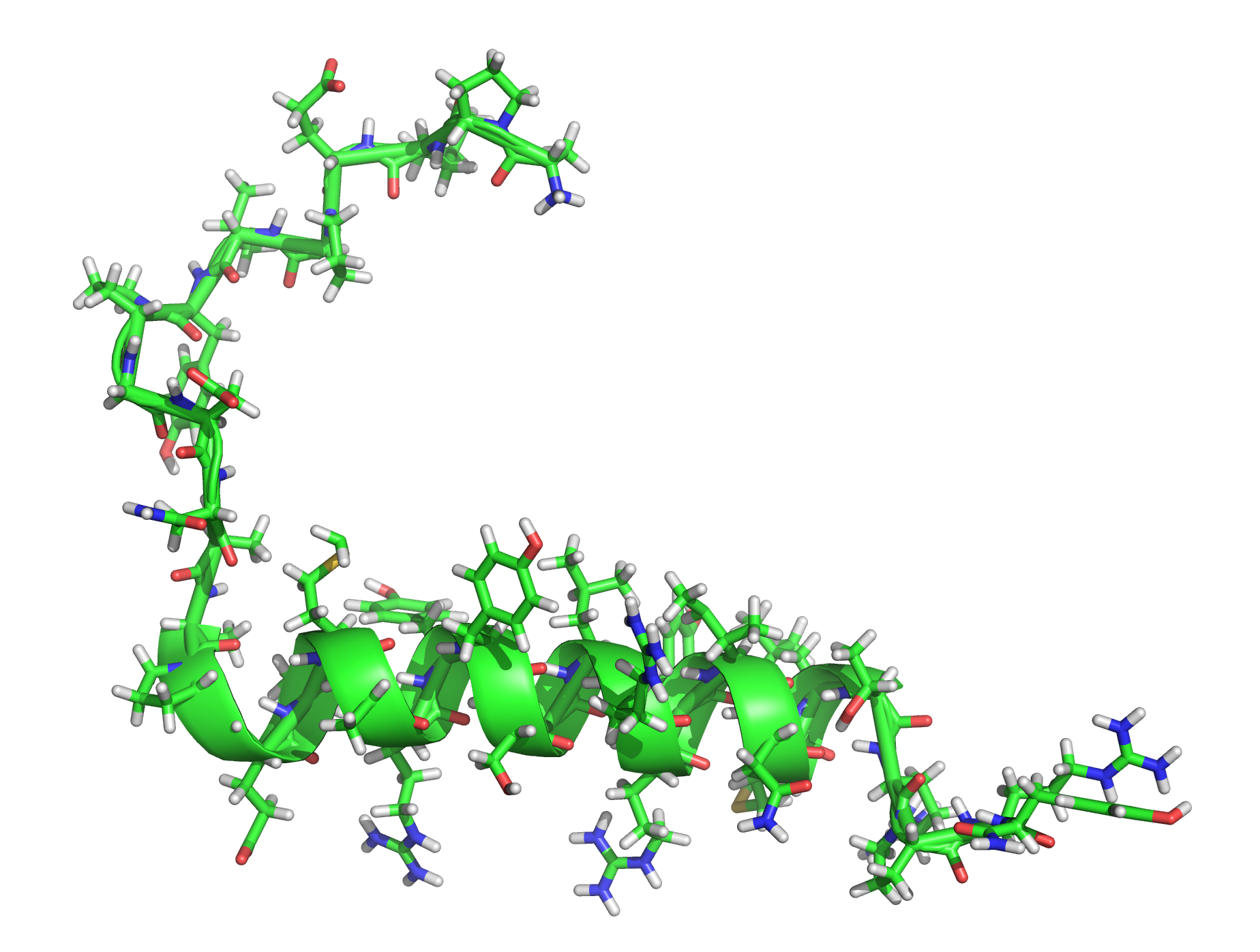
- 3d ribbon/stick model of pancreatic hormone after PDB 1TZ5

Identifiers
- Aliases: PPY, PNP, PP, pancreatic polypeptide
- External IDs: OMIM: 167780; MGI: 97753; GeneCards: PPY
Available structures
PDB	Ortholog search: PDBe RCSB
PDB	List of PDB id codes 1TZ4, 1TZ5

Gene location (Human)
Chr.	Chromosome 17 (human)
Band	17q21.31	Start	43,940,804 bp
Band	17q21.31	End	43,942,476 bp

Gene location (Mouse)
Chr.	Chromosome 11 (mouse)
Band	11|11 D	Start	101,990,756 bp
Band	11|11 D	End	101,992,145 bp
RNA expression pattern
Bgee	Human / Mouse (ortholog); Top expressed in: beta cell; testicle; body of pancreas; gonad; rectum; oocyte; duodenum; right coronary artery; lymph node; right uterine tube / Top expressed in: islet of Langerhans; duodenum; embryo; left colon; thymus; stomach; ileum; placenta; white adipose tissue; right kidney; More reference expression data
BioGPS	n/a
Gene ontology
Molecular function	neuropeptide hormone activity; hormone activity; G protein-coupled receptor binding
Cellular component	cytoplasm; extracellular region; extracellular space
Biological process	cell-cell signaling; regulation of appetite; neuropeptide signaling pathway; feeding behavior; protein secretion; regulation of signaling receptor activity; G protein-coupled receptor signaling pathway
Sources:Amigo / QuickGO
Orthologs
Databases	NCBI: entry; OMA: entry
Species	Human	Mouse
Entrez	5539	19064
Ensembl	ENSG00000108849	ENSMUSG00000017316
UniProt	P01298	P10601
RefSeq (mRNA)	NM_002722; NM_001319209	NM_008918
RefSeq (protein)	NP_001306138; NP_002713	NP_032944
Location (UCSC)	Chr 17: 43.94 – 43.94 Mb	Chr 11: 101.99 – 101.99 Mb
PubMed search
- Wikidata
View/Edit Human	View/Edit Mouse

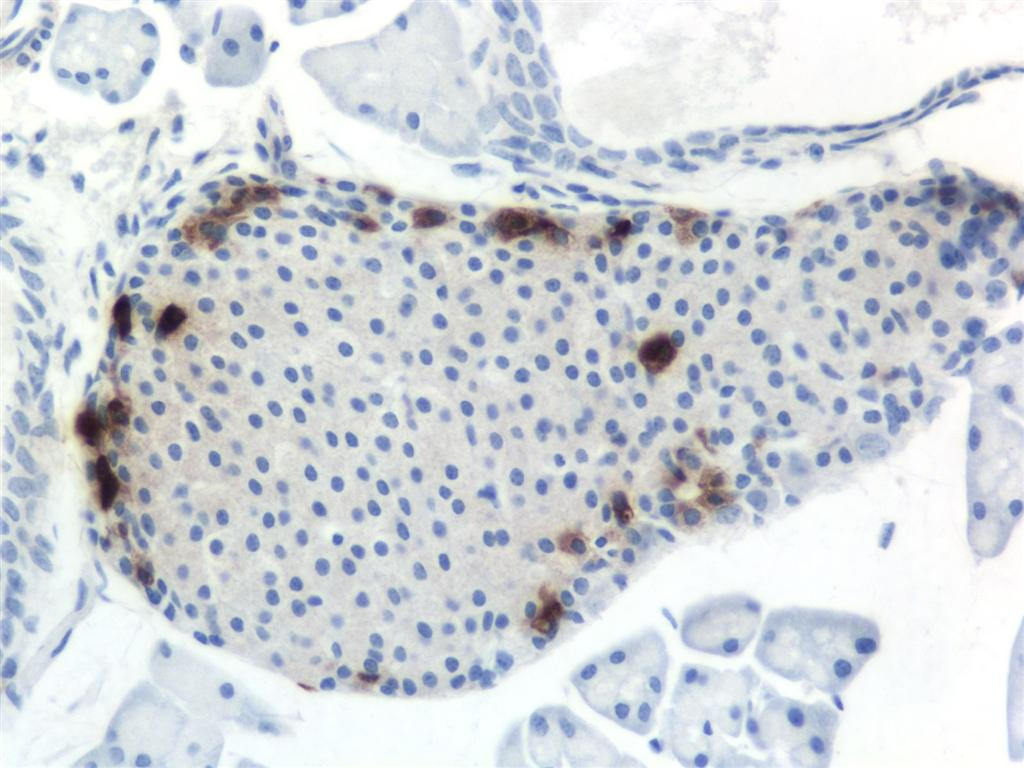
Immunohistochemistry for pancreatic polypeptide in a mouse pancreas, 200×

Pancreatic polypeptide (PP) is a hormone that in humans is encoded by the gene PPY. This polypeptide is secreted by PP cells in the endocrine pancreas. It regulates pancreatic secretion activities, and impacts liver glycogen storage and gastrointestinal secretion. Its secretion may be impacted by certain endocrine tumours.

== Gene ==
The PPY gene encodes an unusually short protein precursor of 95 amino acids in length. This precursor is cleaved to produce the signal peptide, the pancreatic polypeptide, the pancreatic icosapeptide, and a 5- to 7- amino-acid oligopeptide.

== Structure ==
Pancreatic polypeptide consists of 36 amino acids. It has a molecular weight about 4200 Da. It has a similar structure to neuropeptide Y.

== Synthesis ==
Pancreatic polypeptide is synthesised and secreted by PP cells (also known as gamma cells or F cells) of the pancreatic islets of the pancreas. These are found predominantly in the head of the pancreas.

== Function ==
Pancreatic polypeptide regulates pancreatic secretion activities by both endocrine and exocrine tissues. It also affects hepatic glycogen levels and gastrointestinal secretions.

Its secretion in humans is increased after a protein meal, fasting, exercise, and acute hypoglycaemia, and is decreased by somatostatin and intravenous glucose.

Plasma pancreatic polypeptide has been shown to be reduced in conditions associated with increased food intake and elevated in anorexia nervosa. In addition, peripheral administration of polypeptide has been shown to decrease food intake in rodents. Pancreatic polypeptide inhibits pancreatic secretion of fluid, bicarbonate, and digestive enzymes. It also stimulates gastric acid secretion. It is the antagonist of cholecystokinin and opposes pancreatic secretion stimulated by cholecystokinin. It may stimulate the migrating motor complex, synergistic with motilin.

On fasting, pancreatic polypeptide concentration is 80 pg/ml; after the meal, it rises up from 8 to 10 times more; glucose and fats also induce PP's level increase, but on parenteral introduction of those substances, the level of hormones doesn't change. The administration of atropine, the vagotomy, blocks pancreatic polypeptide secretion after meals. The excitation of the vagus nerve, the administration of gastrin, secretin or cholecystokinin induce PP secretion.

== Clinical significance ==
The secretion of pancreatic polypeptide may be increased by pancreatic tumours (insulin, glucagon), by Verner-Morrison syndrome, and by gastrinoma.

== See also ==
- Polypeptide-p
- Pancreas
- List of human cell types derived from the germ layers
