= Neuropeptide Y =

Mammalian protein found in Homo sapiens

npy

Identifiers
- Aliases: neuropeptide Ysi:dkey-22m8.5
- External IDs: MGI: 97374; GeneCards:
Available structures
PDB	Ortholog search: Q9I8P3 PDBe Q9I8P3 RCSB
PDB	List of PDB id codes 1RON, 1QFA

Gene location (Human)
Chr.	Chromosome 19 (human)
Band	n/a	Start	20,110,699 bp
Band	n/a	End	20,114,149 bp

Gene location (Mouse)
Chr.	Chromosome 6 (mouse)
Band	6 B2.3|6 24.04 cM	Start	49,799,690 bp
Band	6 B2.3|6 24.04 cM	End	49,806,487 bp
RNA expression pattern
Bgee	Human / Mouse (ortholog); Top expressed in: brain; nucleus of hypothalamus; lateral hypothalamic nucleus; preoptic area; interneuron; head; layer of retina; pallium; retina amacrine cell; medulla oblongata / Top expressed in: median eminence; arcuate nucleus; adrenal gland; superior frontal gyrus; medial ganglionic eminence; primary visual cortex; prefrontal cortex; inferior colliculi; entorhinal cortex; primary motor cortex; More reference expression data
BioGPS	n/a
Gene ontology
Molecular function	G protein-coupled receptor activity; hormone activity; calcium channel regulator activity; neuropeptide hormone activity; signaling receptor binding; G protein-coupled receptor binding; neuropeptide Y receptor binding
Cellular component	cytoplasm; Golgi apparatus; extracellular region; extracellular space
Biological process	positive regulation of appetite; adult feeding behavior; G protein-coupled receptor signaling pathway, coupled to cyclic nucleotide second messenger; regulation of blood pressure; central nervous system neuron development; feeding behavior; cerebral cortex development; regulation of appetite; cell population proliferation; innate immune response; neuropeptide signaling pathway; neuron projection development; calcium ion transport; chemical synaptic transmission; antimicrobial humoral immune response mediated by antimicrobial peptide; regulation of signaling receptor activity; G protein-coupled receptor signaling pathway; intestinal epithelial cell differentiation
Sources:Amigo / QuickGO
Orthologs
Databases	NCBI: entry; OMA: entry
Species	Human	Mouse
Entrez	30281	109648
Ensembl	ENSDARG00000036222	ENSMUSG00000029819
UniProt	P01303	P57774
RefSeq (mRNA)	NM_131074	NM_023456
RefSeq (protein)	NP_000896; NP_571149	NP_075945
Location (UCSC)	Chr 19: 20.11 – 20.11 Mb	Chr 6: 49.8 – 49.81 Mb
PubMed search
- Wikidata
View/Edit Human	View/Edit Mouse

Neuropeptide Y
Identifiers
- CAS Number: 82785-45-3
- ChemSpider: none
- UNII: BY7U39XXK0
- ChEMBL: ChEMBL267633
- CompTox Dashboard (EPA): DTXSID4037164

Chemical and physical data
- Formula: C_{190}H_{287}N_{55}O_{57}
- Molar mass: 4253.714 g·mol^{−1}

Neuropeptide Y (NPY) is a 36-amino acid neuropeptide that is involved in various physiological and homeostatic processes in both the central and peripheral nervous systems. It is secreted alongside other neurotransmitters such as GABA and glutamate.

In the autonomic system it is produced mainly by neurons of the sympathetic nervous system and serves as a strong vasoconstrictor and also causes growth of fat tissue. In the brain, it is produced in various locations including the hypothalamus, and is thought to have several functions, including: increasing food intake and storage of energy as fat, reducing anxiety and stress, reducing pain perception, affecting the circadian rhythm, reducing voluntary alcohol intake, lowering blood pressure, and controlling epileptic seizures.

== Function ==
Neuropeptide Y has been identified as being synthesized in GABAergic neurons and to act as a neurotransmitter during cellular communication. Neuropeptide Y is expressed in interneurons. NPY exerts most of its effects through Neuropeptide Y receptors, mainly Y1, Y2, Y4, and Y6. All receptors have been indicated as participants in post-synaptic transmission activity, but the Y2 receptor has also been found to be involved in pre-synaptic processing.

The receptor protein that NPY operates on is a G protein-coupled receptor in the rhodopsin like 7-transmembrane GPCR family. Five subtypes of the NPY receptor have been identified in mammals, four of which are functional in humans. Subtypes Y1 and Y5 have known roles in the stimulation of feeding while Y2 and Y4 seem to have roles in appetite inhibition (satiety). Some of these receptors are among the most highly conserved neuropeptide receptors.

High concentrations of neuropeptide Y synthesis and action have been found in the hypothalamus and hippocampus, specifically in the arcuate nucleus (ARC) and dentate gyrus. The arcuate nucleus has been found to have one of the highest concentrations of NPY. This allows NPY to regulate neuroendocrine release of various hypothalamic hormones such as luteinizing hormone. Neuropeptide Y1 receptors have been found in highest density in the dentate gyrus along with a variety of other brain areas.

NPY is able to modulate the mitochondrial network by affecting the expression of many genes involved in mitochondrial functions and dynamics. It has been found that in breast muscle, ATP production genes (uncoupling protein, UCP; nuclear factor erythroid 2 like 2, NFE2L2) and a dynamics gene (mitofusin 1, MFN1) were upregulated (P < 0.05) at a low dose of NPY, while a high dose decreased (P < 0.05) markers of mitochondrial dynamics (mitofusin 2, MFN2; OPA1 mitochondrial dynamin-like GTPase, OPA1) and increased (P < 0.05) genes involved in mitochondrial biogenesis (D-loop, peroxisome proliferator-activated receptor gamma, PPARG).

=== Cell growth ===
Neuropeptide Y has been indicated as playing an important role in neurogenesis in various parts of the brain. Two particular brain areas where NPY affects neurogenesis are the sub-ventricular zone and the dentate gyrus of the hippocampus. These areas are where cell growth and proliferation occur into adulthood.

==== Dentate gyrus ====
The dentate gyrus is significantly involved in cell proliferation, a process modulated by various internal factors including neuropeptide Y. Reduction or elimination of NPY released by interneurons decreased cell growth in this brain area. NPY affects neurogenesis by interacting with ERK kinase signaling pathways. Additionally, NPY acting on and stimulating Y1 receptors present on progenitor cell membranes in order to increase cell proliferation.

==== Sub-ventricular zone ====
Similar to the dentate gyrus, NPY has been found to increase cellular proliferation and differentiation in the sub-ventricular zone by specifically activating Y1 receptors in the ERK1/2 pathway. Additionally, NPY was found in neuronal fibers that pass through the sub-ventricular zone and extend to other brain areas. A variety of other effects and physiological processes involving NPY in the sub-ventricular zone have been discovered, many of which involve neuron migration patterns.

==== Olfactory bulb ====
It was found that after blocking NPY expression in mouse olfactory epithelium, the amount of olfactory precursor cells decreased by half. This in turn caused the mice to develop a lower amount of olfactory cells overall. This study exemplified NPY's influence on precursor cells.

== Discovery ==
Following the isolation of neuropeptide Y (NPY) from the porcine hypothalamus in 1982, researchers began to speculate about the involvement of NPY in hypothalamic-mediated functions. In a 1983 study, NPY-ergic axon terminals were located in the paraventricular nucleus (PVN) of the hypothalamus, and the highest levels of NPY immunoreactivity was found within the PVN of the hypothalamus.

Six years later, in 1989, Morris et al. homed in on the location of NPYergic nuclei in the brain. Furthermore, in situ hybridization results from the study showed the highest cellular levels of NPY mRNA in the arcuate nucleus (ARC) of the hypothalamus.

In 1989, Haas & George reported that local injection of NPY into the PVN resulted in an acute release of corticotropin-releasing hormone (CRH) in the rat brain, proving that NPYergic activity directly stimulates the release and synthesis of CRH.

The latter became a hallmark paper in NPY studies. A significant amount of work had already been done in the 1970s on CRH and its involvement in stress and eating disorders such as obesity. These studies, collectively, marked the beginning for understanding the role of NPY in orexigenesis or food intake.

== Connection to food intake ==
Behavioral assays in orexigenic studies, in which rats are the model organism, have been done collectively with immunoassays and in situ hybridization studies to confirm that elevating NPY-ergic activity does indeed increase food intake. In these studies, exogenous NPY, the glucocorticoid dexamethasone (which activates NPY in the basomedial hypothalamus), or N-acetyl [Leu 28, Leu31] NPY (24-36) are injected into the third ventricle or at the level of the hypothalamus with a cannula.

Furthermore, these studies unanimously demonstrate that the stimulation of NPYergic activity via the administration of certain NPY agonists increases food intake compared to baseline data in rats. The effects of NPYergic activity on food intake is also demonstrated by the blockade of certain NPY receptors (Y1 and Y5 receptors), which, as was expected, inhibited NPYergic activity; thus, decreases food intake. However, a 1999 study by King et al. demonstrated the effects of the activation of the NPY autoreceptor Y2, which has been shown to inhibit the release of NPY and thus acts to regulate food intake upon its activation. In this study a highly selective Y2 antagonist, BIIE0246 was administered locally into the ARC. Radioimmunoassay data, following the injection of BIIE0246, shows a significant increase in NPY release compared to the control group. Though the pharmacological half-life of exogenous NPY, other agonists, and antagonist is still obscure, the effects are not long lasting and the rat body employs an excellent ability to regulate and normalize abnormal NPY levels and therefore food consumption.

== Connection to obesity ==
A study in genetically obese rats demonstrated the role of NPY in obesity. Four underlying factors that contribute to obesity in rats are:

- an increase in glucocorticosteroid concentrations in plasma;
- insensitivity or resistance to insulin;
- mutation of leptin receptor; and
- an increase in NPY mRNA and NPY release.

In obesity chronically elevated levels of NPY can be seen, this has been seen in rats fed on a high fat diet for 22 weeks and resulted in a hormonal derangement that increased NPY release, due to a defective leptin signal compared to control rats. In humans increased levels of free NPY were found in obese women and not in their leaner counterparts, analysing human hypothalamus' for NPY concentration however is more difficult than rats. During weaning in rats there is an early expression of gene mutations that increase hypothalamic release of NPY in rats, however in humans multiple genes are commonly associated with the results of obesity and metabolic syndrome. In most obesity cases the increased secretion of NPY is a central / hypothalamic resistance to energy excess hormone signals such as leptin, that can be a result of a variety of reasons in the CNS. In rodents resistant to obesity when fed on an obesogenic diet they had a significantly lower amount of NPY receptor in the hypothalamus suggesting an increased activity of NPY neurons in obese rats meaning that the reduction in the release of NPY may be beneficial to the reduction of obesity incidence alongside the consumption of a healthy diet and exercise. This would need to be seen in human research before looking at this avenue of weight loss although currently there is some evidence that suggests NPY is a significant predictor in weight regain after weight loss to maintain old levels of energy storage.

Furthermore, these factors correlate with each other. The sustained high levels of glucocorticosteroids stimulate gluconeogenesis, which subsequently causes an increase of blood glucose that activates the release of insulin to regulate glucose levels by causing its reuptake and storage as glycogen in the tissues in the body. In the case of obesity, which researchers speculate to have a strong genetic and a dietary basis, insulin resistance prevents high blood glucose regulation, resulting in morbid levels of glucose and diabetes mellitus. In addition, high levels of glucocorticosteroids causes an increase of NPY by directly activating type II glucocorticosteroids receptors (which are activated only by relatively high levels of glucocorticosteroids) and, indirectly, by abolishing the negative feedback of corticotropin-releasing factor (CRF) on NPY synthesis and release. Meanwhile, obesity-induced insulin resistance and the mutation of the leptin receptor (ObRb) results in the abolition of inhibition of NPYergic activity and ultimately food intake via other negative feedback mechanisms to regulate them. Obesity in rats was significantly reduced by adrenalectomy or hypophysectomy.

A study showed that neuropeptide Y can be used as a biosensor in early detection of childhood obesity

== Clinical significance ==
=== Alcoholism ===
The role of neuropeptide Y has gained substantial attention for its involvement with alcoholism due to its diverse range of physiological effects. NPY neurons have been shown to interact with dopaminergic reward and emotion pathways in the nucleus accumbens and amygdala, respectively. NPY expression levels and alcohol preference have been shown to exhibit an inverse relationship. Expression levels are dependent on the brain area of interest. This indicates that baseline NPY levels could possibly influence innate alcohol preferences.

Previous studies have identified NPY's anxiolytic effects to a possible therapeutic drug target for alcoholism. As stated before, NPY levels and ethanol intake show an inverse relationship, therefore, increasing NPY availability could decrease alcohol intake. By creating a chemical antagonist for a Y2 receptor that would indirectly act as an agonist and stimulate Y1 receptors, alcohol consumption was successfully decreased in rats. Additionally, another similar study identified that NPY expression may be connected to behavioral regulation in relation to alcohol dependence. Administration of neuropeptide Y was found to reduce binge-drinking behavior. Although, it has been shown that NPY gene expression, mRNA or neuropeptide levels are not influenced by long-term alcohol consumption, but changes do occur during withdrawal from alcohol. These findings show that neuropeptide Y has varying effects on alcohol consumption.

Two results suggest that NPY might protect against alcoholism:

- knock-out mice in which a type of NPY receptor has been removed show a higher voluntary intake of alcohol and a higher resistance to alcohol's sedating effects, compared to normal mice;
- the common fruit fly has a neuropeptide that is similar to NPY, known as neuropeptide F. The levels of neuropeptide F are lowered in sexually frustrated male flies, and this causes the flies to increase their voluntary intake of alcohol.

=== Stress and anxiety ===
Neuropeptide Y is considered to be an anxiolytic endogenous peptide and its levels can be modulated by stress. NPY has connections to the HPA axis and is believed to be necessary for stress modulation. It has been shown that higher levels of the Y1 and Y5 receptors in the amygdala result in reduced level of anxiety. Additionally, the Y1 receptor has been linked to anxiolytic effects in the forebrain while Y2 has been associated with the pons.

Conversely, higher levels of NPY may be associated with resilience against and recovery from posttraumatic stress disorder and with dampening the fear response, allowing individuals to perform better under extreme stress.

Studies of mice and monkeys show that repeated stress—and a high-fat, high-sugar diet—stimulate the release of neuropeptide Y, causing fat to build up in the abdomen. Researchers believe that by manipulating levels of NPY, they could eliminate fat from areas where it was not desired and accumulate at sites where it is needed.

== See also ==
- Anorexia nervosa
- Antianalgesia
- Incretin
- Neuropeptide
- Obesity
