= Neuropeptides B/W receptor 2 =

Protein-coding gene in the species Homo sapiens

NPBWR2

Identifiers
- Aliases: NPBWR2, GPR8, Neuropeptides B/W receptor 2, neuropeptides B and W receptor 2
- External IDs: OMIM: 600731; GeneCards: NPBWR2

Gene location (Human)
Chr.	Chromosome 20 (human)
Band	20q13.33	Start	64,103,802 bp
Band	20q13.33	End	64,107,565 bp
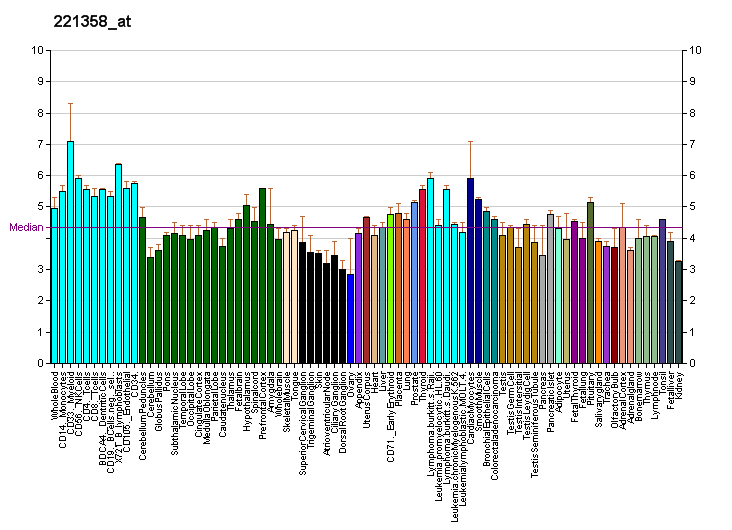
RNA expression pattern
Bgee	Human / Mouse (ortholog); Top expressed in: primary visual cortex; superior frontal gyrus; prefrontal cortex; dorsolateral prefrontal cortex; Brodmann area 9; right frontal lobe; pituitary gland; anterior pituitary; anterior cingulate cortex; adrenal gland / n/a; More reference expression data
BioGPS	More reference expression data
Gene ontology
Molecular function	G protein-coupled opioid receptor activity; neuropeptide binding; protein binding; G protein-coupled receptor activity; signal transducer activity; neuropeptide receptor activity; peptide binding
Cellular component	integral component of membrane; neuron projection; plasma membrane; integral component of plasma membrane; membrane
Biological process	G protein-coupled receptor signaling pathway, coupled to cyclic nucleotide second messenger; neuropeptide signaling pathway; signal transduction; chemical synaptic transmission; G protein-coupled opioid receptor signaling pathway; G protein-coupled receptor signaling pathway
Sources:Amigo / QuickGO
Orthologs
Databases	NCBI: entry; OMA: entry
Species	Human	Mouse
Entrez	2832	n/a
Ensembl	ENSG00000125522; ENSG00000277339	n/a
UniProt	P48146	n/a
RefSeq (mRNA)	NM_005286	n/a
RefSeq (protein)	NP_005277	n/a
Location (UCSC)	Chr 20: 64.1 – 64.11 Mb	n/a
PubMed search		n/a
- Wikidata
View/Edit Human

Neuropeptides B/W receptor 2, also known as NPBW2, is a human protein encoded by the NPBWR2 gene.

The protein encoded by this gene is an integral membrane protein and G protein-coupled receptor. The encoded protein is similar in sequence to another G protein-coupled receptor (GPR7), and it is structurally similar to opioid and somatostatin receptors. This protein binds neuropeptides B and W. This gene is intronless and is expressed primarily in the frontal cortex of the brain.

== See also ==
- Neuropeptide B/W receptor
