= Pro-gastrin-releasing-peptide =

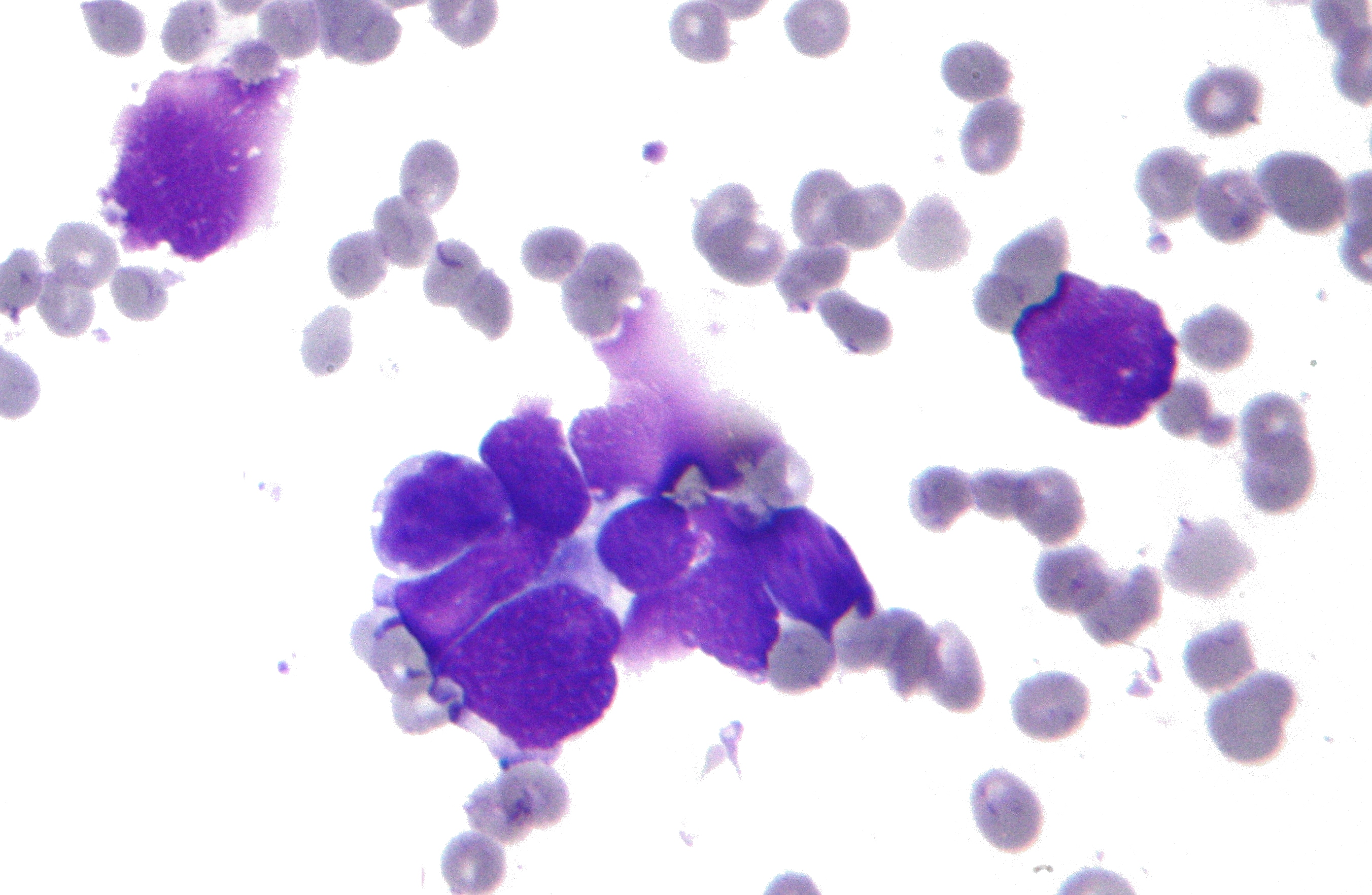

Pro-gastrin-releasing-peptide, also known as Pro-GRP, is a gastrin-releasing peptide (GRP) precursor, a neurotransmitter that belongs to the bombesin-related neuromedin B family. GRP stimulates the secretion of gastrin in order to increase the acidity of the gastric acid. Pro-GRP is a peptide composed of 125 amino acids, expressed in the nervous system and digestive tract. It is different from progastrin, consisting of 80 amino acids, precursor of gastrin in its intracellular version and oncogene in its extracellular version (hPG80).

The presence of GRP in lung cancer samples was identified in 1983. In pathological situations, GRP has mitogenic activity in vitro in many cancers including pancreatic cancer, small cell lung carcinoma, prostate cancer, kidney cancer, breast and colorectal cancer. GRP could operate as an autocrine growth factor. In cancers, GRP induces cell growth and inhibits apoptosis by shutting down the endoplasmic reticulum stress pathway. The mechanisms of the impacted signal pathways have not been established. As early as 1994, research on Pro-GRP as a biomarker for small-cell lung carcinoma began. Because of the very short half-life of GRP (2 minutes), the Pro-GRP is used for measurements and analysis. Since then, Pro-GRP has been used as a tumor marker for patients with small-cell lung carcinoma in limited and extended stages.
