= Bombesin receptor =

Type of G-protein coupled receptor

The bombesin receptors are a group of G-protein coupled receptors which bind bombesin.

Three bombesin receptors are currently known:

- BB_{1}, previously known as Neuromedin B receptor NMBR
- BB_{2}, previously known as Gastrin-releasing peptide receptor GRPR
- BB_{3}, previously known as Bombesin-like receptor 3 BRS3
