= Bombesin-like receptor 3 =

Protein-coding gene in humans

BRS3

Identifiers
- Aliases: BRS3, BB3, bombesin like receptor 3, BB3R, bombesin receptor subtype 3, BBR3
- External IDs: OMIM: 300107; MGI: 1100501; GeneCards: BRS3

Gene location (Human)
Chr.	X chromosome (human)
Band	Xq26.3	Start	136,487,947 bp
Band	Xq26.3	End	136,493,780 bp

Gene location (Mouse)
Chr.	X chromosome (mouse)
Band	X|X A6	Start	56,088,434 bp
Band	X|X A6	End	56,094,118 bp
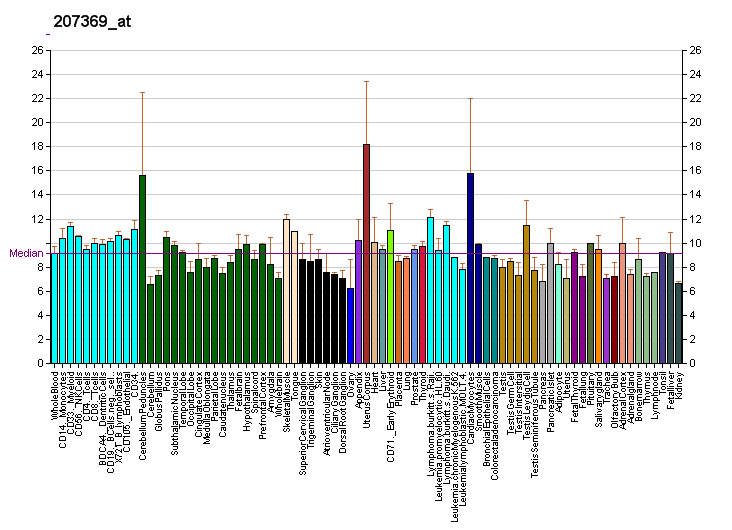
RNA expression pattern
Bgee	Human / Mouse (ortholog); Top expressed in: buccal mucosa cell; corpus epididymis; testicle; caput epididymis; pancreatic ductal cell; islet of Langerhans; tail of epididymis; tibialis anterior muscle; right ovary; left uterine tube / Top expressed in: gastrula; embryo; tibiofemoral joint; lumbar spinal ganglion; carotid body; nucleus of stria terminalis; central gray substance of midbrain; hypothalamus; neck; sternocleidomastoid muscle; More reference expression data
BioGPS	More reference expression data
Gene ontology
Molecular function	bombesin receptor activity; G protein-coupled peptide receptor activity; G protein-coupled receptor activity; signal transducer activity
Cellular component	integral component of membrane; neuron projection; soma; plasma membrane; membrane; integral component of plasma membrane
Biological process	regulation of blood pressure; G protein-coupled receptor signaling pathway; bombesin receptor signaling pathway; adult feeding behavior; signal transduction; glucose metabolic process
Sources:Amigo / QuickGO
Orthologs
Databases	NCBI: entry; OMA: entry
Species	Human	Mouse
Entrez	680	12209
Ensembl	ENSG00000102239	ENSMUSG00000031130
UniProt	P32247	O54798
RefSeq (mRNA)	NM_001727	NM_009766
RefSeq (protein)	NP_001718	NP_033896
Location (UCSC)	Chr X: 136.49 – 136.49 Mb	Chr X: 56.09 – 56.09 Mb
PubMed search
- Wikidata
View/Edit Human	View/Edit Mouse

The bombesin receptor subtype 3 also known as BRS-3 or BB_{3} is a protein which in humans is encoded by the BRS3 gene.

== Function ==
Mammalian bombesin-like peptides are widely distributed in the central nervous system as well as in the gastrointestinal tract, where they modulate smooth-muscle contraction, exocrine and endocrine processes, metabolism, and behavior. They bind to G protein-coupled receptors on the cell surface to elicit their effects. Bombesin-like peptide receptors include gastrin-releasing peptide receptor, neuromedin B receptor, and bombesin-like receptor-3 (BRS3; this article).

BB_{3} is a G protein-coupled receptor. BB_{3} only interacts with known naturally occurring bombesin-related peptides with low affinity and therefore, as it has no natural high-affinity ligand, is classified as an orphan receptor.
