= Progastrin =

Progastrin is an 80-amino acid intracellular protein and the precursor of gastrin, a gastrointestinal hormone produced by G cells in the gastric antrum. The main function of gastrin is to regulate acid secretion. During digestion, only gastrin is released into the bloodstream and stimulates the secretion of hydrochloric acid in the stomach as well as pancreatic digestive enzymes. In humans, progastrin is encoded by the GAST gene. Progastrin is expressed primarily in stomach tissue.

== Discovery ==
In 1905, John Sydney Edkins demonstrated the existence of a hormone responsible for the secretion of gastric acid. This hormone was named gastric secretin or gastrin. But it was not until 1979 and later in 1987 and 1988 that progastrin was identified as the precursor to gastrin. His protein sequence and mRNA were revealed.

Not to be confused with progastrin, Pro-Gastrin-Releasing-Peptide is the precursor of Gastrin-releasing peptide (GRP), a neuropeptide which belongs to the bombesin/neuromedin B family and whose expression is important in the intestine and brain. GRP is involved in many physiological and pathophysiological processes. Gastrin-Releasing Peptide stimulates the release of gastrin and other gastrointestinal hormones. It helps regulate food intake. There are also two types of progastrin, the intracellular progastrin discussed in this article and the extracellular progastrin, mainly called hPG80.

== Structure and production ==
The GAST gene is located on chromosome 17 (17q21). It consists of three exons containing the sequence that encodes preprogastrin. Progastrin is made up of several alpha helices. The primary structure of human preprogastrin consists of a 21 amino acid signal sequence at the N-terminus followed by a spacer peptide, a bioactive domain and finally a C-terminal flanking peptide (CTFP).

== Action ==
The production of gastrin allows the production of gastric acid during food intake to be promoted. Progastrin has also been shown to be expressed in other healthy tissues (cerebellum, pituitary gland, pancreas, testicles), but to a much lesser extent than in the stomach and in different forms. For example, carboxyamide gastrin is found in the testicles. However, the role of progastrin in these organs is not clearly established.

== Biosynthesis ==
In humans, the GAST gene encodes a 101-amino acid precursor peptide, preprogastrin. The latter is synthesized and matured in the endoplasmic reticulum. Upon initiation of translation, the signal sequence facilitating the translocation of the polypeptide is eliminated by a membrane-bound signal peptidase. This enzyme cleaves the born polypeptide chain between alanine residue 21 and serine 22 to generate the 80-amino acid peptide progastrin. The progastrin is then cleaved by an enzyme to give the main circulating biologically active forms of gastrin: gastrin-34 and gastrin-17, in sulfated and unsulfated forms. Both sulfation and phosphorylation play a role in the maturation process: they increase the maturation of progastrin. While phosphorylation can also affect the conversion of intermediate products with carboxy-terminal glycine (G34-Gly and G17-Gly) to mature gastrins. Small amounts of gastrin-52 (also called component 1), gastrin-14 (mini-gastrin) and even smaller fragments were detected in the serum. At this stage, two pathways of post-translational modifications exist within the antral G cells. In the dominant pathway, progastrin is cleaved at three sites, resulting in two major bioactive gastrins, gastrin-34 and gastrin-17. In the putative alternative pathway, progastrin can be cleaved only at the dibasic site closest to the C-terminus, resulting in the synthesis of gastrin-71. The other maturation products, in particular G34-Gly, G17-Gly and CTFP have various functions. CTFP has been described as capable of inducing or inhibiting apoptosis, depending on the tissue or cell type involved. After the progastrin conversion step, there is a passage through the secretory pathway.

== Under pathological conditions ==
As early as 1996, it was demonstrated that the expression of the GAST gene is required for the cellular tumorigenicity of human colorectal cancer. The GAST gene has been shown to be a downstream target of the β-catenin/TCF-4 signalling pathway. Transfection of a construct expressing a constitutively active form of β-catenin triples the activity of the GAST gene promoter. This study establishes a link between progastrin and cancer across many cellular functions involving the Wnt pathway in a cancer cell, starting with its importance for cancer stem cell survival. In pathological situations, progastrin is secreted by tumor cells into the bloodstream and is referred to as hPG80.

The expression of progastrin in many cancers has been demonstrated. It has been noted that in colorectal cancers, progastrin is more than 700 times more abundant than amidated gastrin. Another study showed that colorectal carcinomas have progastrin-derived peptides that are not converted to gastrin. Finally, it has been shown that half of the tumor cells express progastrin. Ovarian, liver and pancreatic cancers present the same scenario: unmatured progastrin is more abundant than amidated gastrin. This is because progastrin is not fully matured and is secreted into the bloodstream for many cancers.
