= H1299 =

H1299, also known as NCI-H1299 or CRL-5803, is a human non-small cell lung carcinoma cell line derived from the lymph node, which is widely used in research.

As with other immortalized cell lines, H1299 cells can divide indefinitely. These cells have a homozygous partial deletion of the TP53 gene and as a result, do not express the tumor suppressor p53 protein which in part accounts for their proliferative propensity. These cells have also been reported to secrete the peptide hormone neuromedin B (NMB), but not gastrin-releasing peptide (GRP).
