= Lutetium-177 NeoBOMB1 =

Investigational radiopharmaceutical

^{177}Lu NeoB

Clinical data
- Other names: Lutetium-177 NeoBOMB1
- Routes of administration: Intravenous
- Drug class: Radiopharmaceutical
- ATC code: V10

Identifiers
- IUPAC name: 2-[4-[2-[[4-[[2-[2-[[(2R)-1-[[(2S)-5-amino-1-[[(2S)-1-[[(2S)-1-[[(2S)-1-[[2-[[(2S)-1-(2,6-dimethylheptan-4-ylamino)-3-(1H-imidazol-5-yl)-1-oxopropan-2-yl]amino]-2-oxoethyl]amino]-3-methyl-1-oxobutan-2-yl]amino]-1-oxopropan-2-yl]amino]-3-(1H-indol-3-yl)-1-oxopropan-2-yl]amino]-1,5-dioxopentan-2-yl]amino]-1-oxo-3-phenylpropan-2-yl]amino]-2-oxoethoxy]acetyl]amino]phenyl]methylamino]-2-oxoethyl]-7,10-bis(carboxylatomethyl)-1,4,7,10-tetrazacyclododec-1-yl]acetate;lutetium-177(3+)
- CAS Number: 1589488-42-5
- PubChem CID: 137528224
- ChemSpider: 81367507
- UNII: U46D6MZM1V

Chemical and physical data
- 3D model (JSmol): Interactive image
- SMILES: C[C@@H](C(=O)N[C@@H](C(C)C)C(=O)NCC(=O)N[C@@H](CC1=CN=CN1)C(=O)NC(CC(C)C)CC(C)C)NC(=O)[C@H](CC2=CNC3=CC=CC=C32)NC(=O)[C@H](CCC(=O)N)NC(=O)[C@@H](CC4=CC=CC=C4)NC(=O)COCC(=O)NC5=CC=C(C=C5)CNC(=O)CN6CCN(CCN(CCN(CC6)CC(=O)[O-])CC(=O)[O-])CC(=O)[O-].[177Lu+3]
- InChI: InChI=1S/C77H110N18O18.Lu/c1-47(2)31-55(32-48(3)4)86-75(110)62(35-56-38-79-46-83-56)87-64(97)39-82-77(112)71(49(5)6)91-72(107)50(7)84-74(109)61(34-53-37-80-58-16-12-11-15-57(53)58)90-73(108)59(21-22-63(78)96)89-76(111)60(33-51-13-9-8-10-14-51)88-67(100)45-113-44-66(99)85-54-19-17-52(18-20-54)36-81-65(98)40-92-23-25-93(41-68(101)102)27-29-95(43-70(105)106)30-28-94(26-24-92)42-69(103)104;/h8-20,37-38,46-50,55,59-62,71,80H,21-36,39-45H2,1-7H3,(H2,78,96)(H,79,83)(H,81,98)(H,82,112)(H,84,109)(H,85,99)(H,86,110)(H,87,97)(H,88,100)(H,89,111)(H,90,108)(H,91,107)(H,101,102)(H,103,104)(H,105,106);/q;+3/p-3/t50-,59-,60+,61-,62-,71-;/m0./s1/i;1+2; Key:QCSRNPBXYZCFIZ-QIFSQXIVSA-K

177Lu-NeoB (also known as Lutetium-177 NeoBOMB1) is an investigational radiopharmaceutical composed of NeoB, a gastrin-releasing peptide receptor (GRPR)-targeting antagonist, conjugated via tetraazacyclododecanetetraacetic acid (DOTA) to the beta-emitting radioisotope lutetium-177 (177Lu). Developed by Advanced Accelerator Applications, a Novartis company, it is intended for theranostic (for both diagnosis and treatment) applications in GRPR-overexpressing malignancies, including prostate cancer, breast cancer, gastrointestinal stromal tumors (GIST), lung cancer, and glioblastoma.

Administered intravenously, 177Lu-NeoB targets GRPR-expressing tumor cells, delivering cytotoxic beta radiation while enabling imaging when paired with its diagnostic counterpart, 68Ga-NeoB.

As of May 2025, 177Lu-NeoB is under investigation in phase I/IIa clinical trials and is not approved for clinical use.

== Medical use ==
177Lu-NeoB is being developed for the treatment of advanced or metastatic solid tumors known to overexpress GRPR, such as prostate cancer, breast cancer, GIST, lung cancer, and glioblastoma.

It is administered as a targeted radioligand therapy, aiming to deliver beta radiation to tumor cells while sparing healthy tissues.

In clinical trials, patients are screened with 68Ga-NeoB positron emission tomography (PET)/computed tomography (CT) or PET/magnetic resonance imaging (MRI) to confirm GRPR expression via lesion uptake, ensuring eligibility for 177Lu-NeoB therapy.

A phase I/IIa trial is evaluating its safety, tolerability, dosimetry, and anti-tumor activity, while a phase Ib trial explores its use in combination with ribociclib and fulvestrant for estrogen receptor-positive (ER+), human epidermal growth factor receptor-2-negative (HER2-), GRPR-positive breast cancer.

As of May 2025, no regulatory approvals have been granted.

== Mechanism of action ==
177Lu-NeoB is a radioconjugate comprising NeoB, a high-affinity peptide GRPR antagonist (with the sequence D-Phe-Gln-Trp-Ala-Val-Gly-His-Leu-NHEt), linked to 177Lu via a DOTA chelator. Upon intravenous administration, it selectively binds to GRPRs, which are overexpressed in certain cancers (e.g., prostate, breast, GIST). After binding and internalization into tumor cells, 177Lu emits beta radiation, causing DNA damage and cell death in GRPR-expressing cells. The GRPR, also known as bombesin receptor subtype 2, is a G protein-coupled receptor with high expression in specific malignancies, making it a promising theranostic target. The use of 68Ga-NeoB for imaging complements 177Lu-NeoB, enabling a theranostic approach for patient selection and treatment monitoring.

== Clinical trials ==
=== Preclinical studies ===
Preclinical studies in mice have demonstrated 177Lu-NeoB’s efficacy and safety. In a PC-3 prostate cancer xenograft model, three doses (30 MBq/300 pmol, 40 MBq/400 pmol, 60 MBq/600 pmol) significantly improved median survival (82–99 days vs. 19 days for controls, p<0.0001), with no significant differences between dose groups. Tumor uptake was high (11.6–17.9 %ID/g at 240 min), with faster clearance from the pancreas than the tumor, improving the tumor-to-pancreas ratio. Toxicity studies in healthy mice (40–120 MBq/400–1200 pmol, three injections) identified the kidneys as the primary toxicity target, with atrophy, fibrosis, and inflammation observed at higher doses after 24 weeks. No significant pancreatic toxicity was observed.

In a gastrointestinal stromal tumor (GIST) model, 177Lu-NeoB showed high tumor uptake and favorable pharmacokinetics, supporting its potential for GRPR-expressing tumors. Biodistribution studies confirmed significant uptake in the pancreas and kidneys due to GRPR expression and renal excretion, respectively, with higher peptide amounts (e.g., 200 pmol) reducing pancreatic uptake.

=== Phase I/IIa Trial ===
A phase I/IIa, open-label, multi-center trial (NCT03872778) is evaluating 177Lu-NeoB in patients with advanced solid tumors (prostate, breast, lung, GIST, glioblastoma) showing 68Ga-NeoB uptake. The study assesses safety, tolerability, whole-body distribution, radiation dosimetry, and anti-tumor activity. Patients receive 177Lu-NeoB every 28 days for up to 6 cycles, with eligibility based on at least one measurable lesion with 68Ga-NeoB uptake (visual scoring scale ≥2). As of May 2025, the trial is ongoing, with no published results.

=== Phase Ib breast cancer trial ===
A phase Ib dose-finding study (NCT05870579) is investigating 177Lu-NeoB (100–250 mCi) in combination with ribociclib and fulvestrant in ER+, HER2-, GRPR+ advanced breast cancer patients who relapsed early or progressed on endocrine therapy. The study includes dose escalation and backfill (enrolling additional patients at dose levels that have already been deemed safe, while the main dose-escalation cohort continues to explore higher doses) parts, with 177Lu-NeoB administered on day 1 of each 28-day cycle for 6 cycles, alongside ribociclib (days 1–21) and fulvestrant. 68Ga-NeoB imaging is used for screening and monitoring. The trial is ongoing, with no results reported as of May 2025.

== Safety and side effects ==
Preclinical studies indicate that 177Lu-NeoB is generally well-tolerated, with the kidneys as the primary toxicity target. In healthy mice, repeated doses (40–120 MBq) caused kidney atrophy, fibrosis, and inflammation at 24 weeks, particularly at higher doses, but no significant pancreatic toxicity was observed. Human trials exclude patients with significant cardiac, renal, or pancreatic conditions to minimize risks. Common exclusion criteria include uncontrolled heart disease, acute myocardial infarction within 3 months, or prior radiopharmaceutical use within 10 half-lives of 177Lu-NeoB. No clinical safety data are available as of May 2025, as trials are ongoing.

== History ==
177Lu-NeoB was originally developed by Erasmus University Rotterdam and the National Center for Scientific Research Demokritos, with Advanced Accelerator Applications advancing its clinical development. Acquired by Novartis, it is part of their radiopharmaceutical portfolio, alongside Lutathera and Pluvicto.
