= Kuwanon G =

Names
- IUPAC name 8-[(1R,2S,3S)-2-(2,4-Dihydroxybenzoyl)-2′,4′-dihydroxy-5-methyl-1,2,3,6-tetrahydro[1,1′-biphenyl]-3-yl]-2′,4′,5,7-tetrahydroxy-3-(3-methylbut-2-en-1-yl)flavone
- Systematic IUPAC name 8-[(1R,2S,3S)-2-(2,4-Dihydroxybenzoyl)-2′,4′-dihydroxy-5-methyl-1,2,3,6-tetrahydro[1,1′-biphenyl]-3-yl]-2-(2,4-dihydroxyphenyl)-5,7-dihydroxy-3-(3-methylbut-2-en-1-yl)-4H-1-benzopyran-4-one
- Other names moracenin b

Identifiers
CAS Number	75629-19-5
3D model (JSmol)	Interactive image
ChEBI	CHEBI:6146
ChEMBL	ChEMBL444942
ChemSpider	4444986
KEGG	C10099
PubChem CID	5281667
UNII	GQ6QVK8YZM
CompTox Dashboard (EPA)	DTXSID40226540
- InChI: InChI=1S/C40H36O11/c1-18(2)4-8-26-38(50)36-33(48)17-32(47)35(40(36)51-39(26)25-11-7-22(43)16-31(25)46)28-13-19(3)12-27(23-9-5-20(41)14-29(23)44)34(28)37(49)24-10-6-21(42)15-30(24)45/h4-7,9-11,13-17,27-28,34,41-48H,8,12H2,1-3H3/t27-,28-,34-/m0/s1 Key: APPXYONGBIXGRO-AIQWNVMPSA-N; InChI=1/C40H36O11/c1-18(2)4-8-26-38(50)36-33(48)17-32(47)35(40(36)51-39(26)25-11-7-22(43)16-31(25)46)28-13-19(3)12-27(23-9-5-20(41)14-29(23)44)34(28)37(49)24-10-6-21(42)15-30(24)45/h4-7,9-11,13-17,27-28,34,41-48H,8,12H2,1-3H3/t27-,28-,34-/m0/s1 Key: APPXYONGBIXGRO-AIQWNVMPBO
- SMILES: CC1=C[C@@H]([C@H]([C@@H](C1)C2=C(C=C(C=C2)O)O)C(=O)C3=C(C=C(C=C3)O)O)C4=C(C=C(C5=C4OC(=C(C5=O)CC=C(C)C)C6=C(C=C(C=C6)O)O)O)O

Properties
Chemical formula	C_{40}H_{36}O_{11}
Molar mass	692.717 g·mol^{−1}
- Except where otherwise noted, data are given for materials in their standard state (at 25 °C [77 °F], 100 kPa). Infobox references

Kuwanon G is an antimicrobial bombesin receptor antagonist isolated from white mulberry (Morus alba).
