= Nemifitide =

Chemical compound

Clinical data
- Routes of administration: Subcutaneous injection
- ATC code: none

Legal status
- Legal status: In general: non-regulated

Pharmacokinetic data
- Elimination half-life: 15-30 minutes

Identifiers
- IUPAC name: (4R)-4-hydroxy-_{L}-prolyl-N^{5}-(diaminomethylidene)-_{L}-ornithylglycyl-N-[(2S)-2-amino-3-(4-fluorophenyl)propanoyl]-_{L}-tryptophanamide
- CAS Number: 173240-15-8
- PubChem CID: 6918348
- ChemSpider: 5293552
- UNII: RO19OXA9NG

Chemical and physical data
- Formula: C_{33}H_{43}FN_{10}O_{6}
- Molar mass: 694.769 g·mol^{−1}
- 3D model (JSmol): Interactive image
- SMILES: C1[C@H](CN([C@@H]1C(=O)N[C@@H](CCCN=C(N)N)C(=O)NCC(=O)N[C@@H](CC2=CNC3=CC=CC=C32)C(=O)N)C(=O)[C@H](CC4=CC=C(C=C4)F)N)O
- InChI: InChI=1S/C33H43FN10O6/c34-20-9-7-18(8-10-20)12-23(35)32(50)44-17-21(45)14-27(44)31(49)43-25(6-3-11-39-33(37)38)30(48)41-16-28(46)42-26(29(36)47)13-19-15-40-24-5-2-1-4-22(19)24/h1-2,4-5,7-10,15,21,23,25-27,40,45H,3,6,11-14,16-17,35H2,(H2,36,47)(H,41,48)(H,42,46)(H,43,49)(H4,37,38,39)/t21-,23+,25+,26+,27+/m1/s1; Key:SGXPTOACEHQGHL-RCNLLYRESA-N

Nemifitide (INN-00835) is a novel antidepressant drug with a pentapeptide structure similar to that of melanocyte-inhibiting factor (MIF-1) and the amino acid sequence 4-F-Phe-4-OH-Pro-Arg-Gly-Trp-NH_{2}. It is under development by Tetragenex (previously Innapharma, Inc.) for the treatment of major depressive disorder. It has been given to over 430 people over the course of 12 clinical trials throughout a little over the past decade and has reached Phase III studies, but has not yet been approved for marketing in any country.

Nemifitide has shown mixed efficacy in alleviating depressive symptoms, but in the cases in which it has worked it has proven to have a rapid onset of action (~5–7 days), few to no side effects, and an excellent safety profile. However, it is inactive orally and must be administered via subcutaneous injection. Remarkably, despite having a very short half-life of only 15–30 minutes, in most or all studies assessing its efficacy nemifitide has been administered merely once daily via the subcutaneous route and yet is effective for depression.

The mechanism of action of nemifitide is unclear, but since MIF-1 has been demonstrated to have similar antidepressant effects it may act in an analogous manner. Possibly of interest however is that nemifitide binds to several receptors including 5-HT_{2A} (where it has been shown to act as an antagonist), NPY_{1}, bombesin, and MC_{4} and MC_{5}, though at only micromolar concentrations. Whether any of these relatively weak actions are of any clinical significance is unclear.

== See also ==
- Melanocyte-inhibiting factor
- PE 22-28
