= Cyclamin =

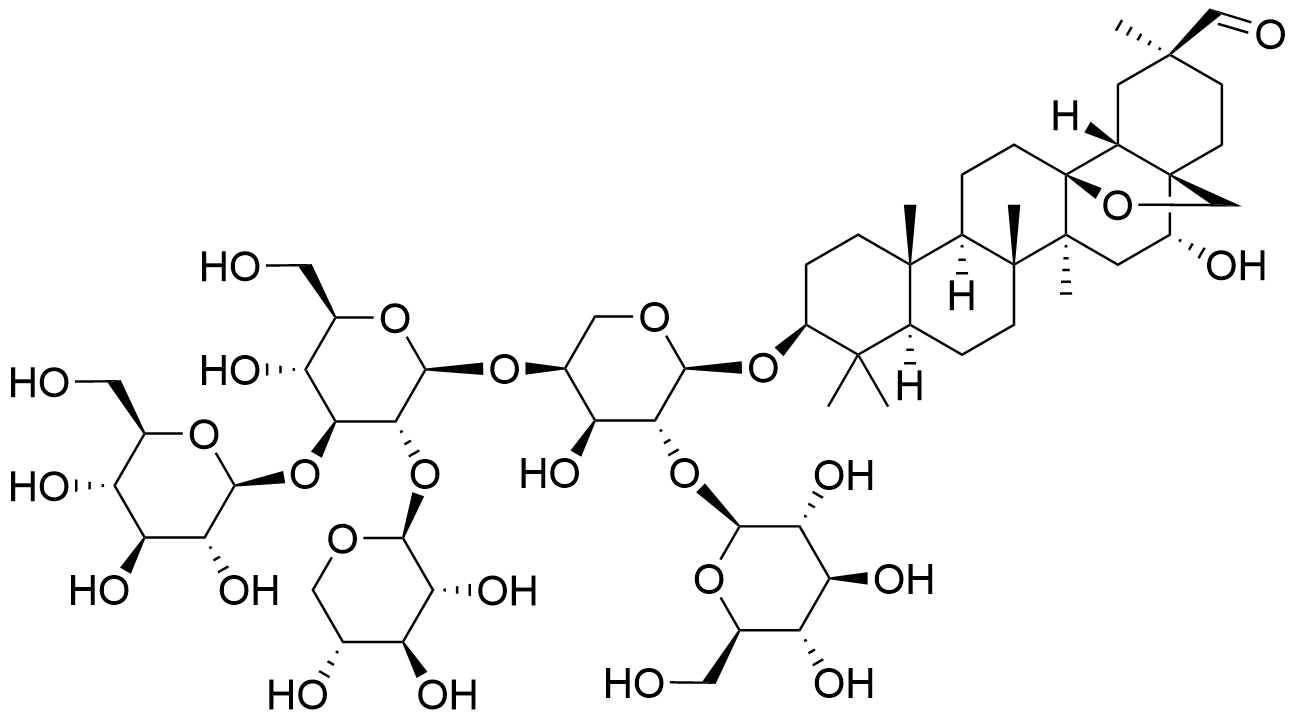

Identifiers
CAS Number	23643-76-7
3D model (JSmol)	Interactive image
ChEBI	CHEBI:3987
ChEMBL	ChEMBL373379
ChemSpider	390491
KEGG	C08938
PubChem CID	441916
CompTox Dashboard (EPA)	DTXSID301318584
- InChI: InChI=1S/C58H94O27/c1-52(2)29-7-11-55(5)30(8-12-58-31-15-53(3,22-62)13-14-57(31,23-77-58)32(64)16-56(55,58)6)54(29,4)10-9-33(52)82-50-45(84-49-43(74)40(71)36(67)26(18-60)79-49)38(69)28(21-76-50)81-51-46(85-47-41(72)34(65)24(63)20-75-47)44(37(68)27(19-61)80-51)83-48-42(73)39(70)35(66)25(17-59)78-48/h22,24-51,59-61,63-74H,7-21,23H2,1-6H3/t24-,25-,26-,27-,28+,29+,30-,31-,32-,33+,34+,35-,36-,37-,38+,39+,40+,41-,42-,43-,44+,45-,46-,47+,48+,49+,50+,51+,53+,54+,55-,56+,57-,58+/m1/s1 Key: JPEQATLMKATGAQ-JOONIPAFSA-N
- SMILES: CC1(C2CCC3(C(C2(CCC1OC4C(C(C(CO4)OC5C(C(C(C(O5)CO)O)OC6C(C(C(C(O6)CO)O)O)O)OC7C(C(C(CO7)O)O)O)O)OC8C(C(C(C(O8)CO)O)O)O)C)CCC91C3(CC(C2(C9CC(CC2)(C)C=O)CO1)O)C)C)C

Properties
Chemical formula	C_{58}H_{94}O_{27}
Molar mass	1223.3

Pharmacology
Routes of administration	Intravenous; Oral; SC
- Except where otherwise noted, data are given for materials in their standard state (at 25 °C [77 °F], 100 kPa). Infobox references

Cyclamin is an organic compound that has been used by the pharmaceutical industry as an ingredient for nasal sprays.

== History ==
Research on the cytotoxic and anticlastogenic activities of the cyclamen genus has been limited. In the 1950s and 1960s little research was done on the toxic saponin cyclamin, but no further investigation has recently been performed. Cyclamin, a triterpenoid pentasaccharidic saponin, has previously been extracted from different cyclamen species, including Cyclamen mirabile, Cyclamen trocopteranthum, Cyclamen libanoticum and Cylamen persicum.

== Available forms ==
Cyclamin can be extracted from cyclamen plants such as the species mirabile and trocopteranthum. Cyclamen are known houseplants; this raises concerns about the awareness of the toxicity of this flower. The compound cyclamin belongs to the family of triterpene saponins, which are derived from the saponin structure. Triterpenoid compounds contain one or more sugar moieties attached to triterpenoid aglycones. The large diversity of structures causes saponins to exhibit a wide range of biological and pharmacological properties. In China, cyclamin has been used as a traditional medicine for years. Cyclamen has been used against menstrual disorders, digestive disorders, and anxiety in women. However, this is only the case for the leaves, the roots of the plants are known to be harmful if ingested. In these roots, cyclamin is found, as well as in the bulbs. Therefore, cyclamin is suspected to be the compound which causes the toxicity of these roots and bulbs in cyclamen plants.

== Structure and Reactivity ==
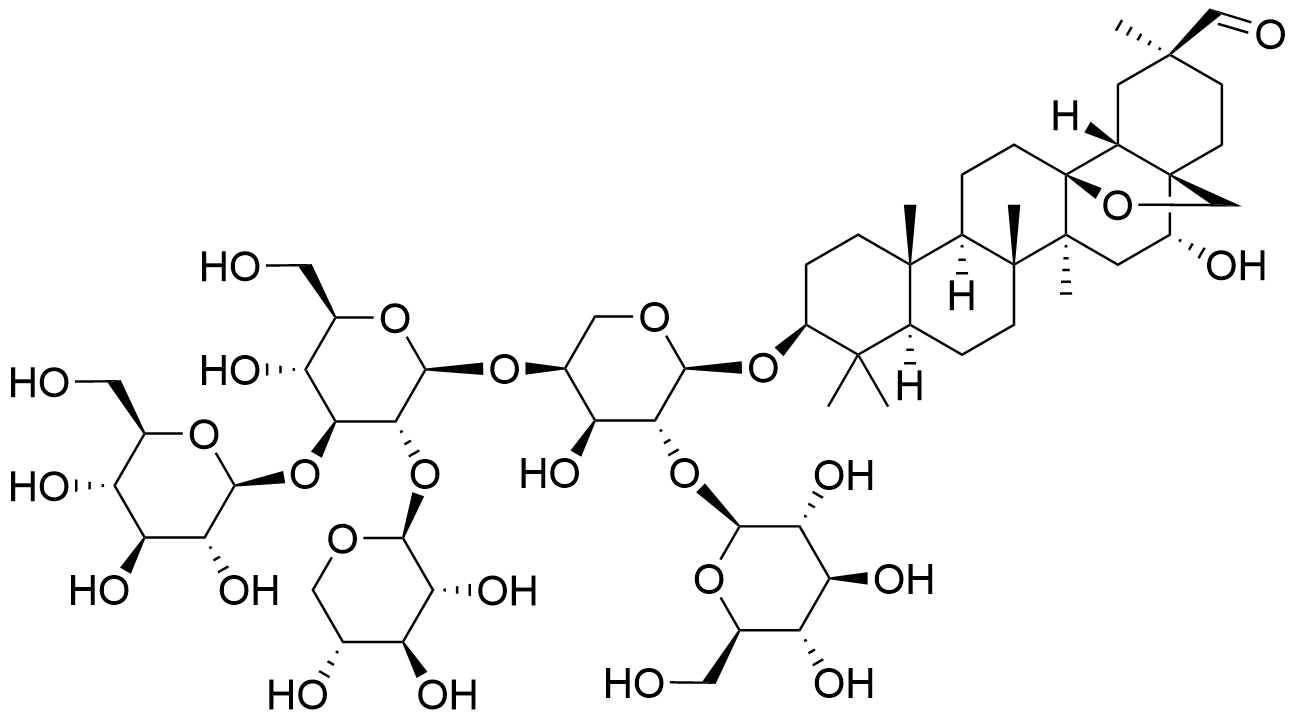
Figure 1: The chemical structure of Cyclamin

As can be seen in Figure 1, cyclamin consists of a hydrophilic part with five connected saccharide groups. The second part of the cyclamin molecule consists of a non-polar, sterol-like backbone. These two different parts make that cyclamin molecules, and saponins in general, are highly amphipathic compounds. However, the exact mechanism of action of cyclamin has not been extensively researched. The structure-activity relationship (SAR) of cyclamin is not yet known.

The amphipathic nature of cyclamin makes the compound permeable through the membrane. The carbohydrate part of saponins is water-soluble, making them surface-active. Cyclamin is known as a white opaque substance obtained in solid form that absorbs up to 45% water. Upon absorption of water, it becomes a transparent substance. Furthermore, it is soluble in alcohol and turns brown when exposed to light. Saponins overall are known to be soluble in polar solvents. Except for alcohol and water, cyclamin has not been further tested. When dissolved in water, it produces foam by frothing test and upon heating it has the unique property of coagulation. Concentrated sulfuric acid colours cyclamin in purple red, which disappears with water addition.

== Mechanism of action ==
Not much is known about the mechanism of action of cyclamin. However, a study proposed possible mechanisms of action based on their experimental results. Firstly, cyclamin might activate the proteins caspase-3, caspase-8 and caspase-9. Caspases are proteins that can induce apoptosis when being activated.

Secondly, cyclamin could be responsible for increasing the expression levels of the cyclin-dependent kinase 2 and the cell division cycle 25 homolog A. This can lead to increased DNA synthesis and cell proliferation and an increase in signal transduction pathways.

Thirdly, cyclamin could increase the ratio of Bax/B-cell lymphoma 2 expression. This would favour apoptosis to take place.

Another property that was found is that cyclamin increases the permeability of Bel-7402 cells. This might be the reason why cyclamin enhances the effect of some chemotherapeutical drugs.

== Indications and symptoms ==
Cyclamin is an irritant compound that causes gastroenteritis, bloody stools, dizziness, seizures and even death by asphyxiation. Studied by many physiologists, cyclamin was viewed merely as a local irritant. However, considering the toxic effects of cyclamin, this a misconception. The roots and bulbs of cyclamen plants containing cyclamin are known to cause severe diarrhea, nausea, vomiting and even death if eaten raw.

== Adverse and side effects ==
As cyclamin is not yet used as pharmaceutical drug such as for chemotherapy, no side effects were yet determined.

== Applications ==
Cyclamin is used as an ingredient for a nasal spray to reduce the tension of the wall and induce secretion of mucus. Furthermore, due to its toxic effects on different (cancer) cell types, cyclamin might be considered for use as chemotherapeutic drug. However, more research first has to be done to reduce its toxicity on normal human cells.

== Toxicological data ==
In a study, cyclamin was tested regarding its toxicity against several types of cancer cells: SK-BR-3, HT-29, HepG2/3A, NCI-H1299, BXPC-3, 22RV1 but also on its toxicity against human normal fibroblasts DMEM, which are not cancer cells. The results showed that cyclamin induced a significant increase of micronucleated cells after it was activated through metabolism. This means that heritable chromosome mutations could occur in these cells. This result was observed in all cell types that were analysed in this study, therefore including the fibroblasts. The toxicity was indicated by the IC50 value which gives the concentration of the compound at which it causes 50% of its inhibitory effect e.g. on enzymes in cells. The IC50 values of cyclamin were very similar across the different cell types, ranging from 0.32μM – 0.84μM, with the lowest IC50 value in the human normal fibroblasts DMEM cells, which indicates unspecific toxicity of cyclamin across different cell types (Table 1).

Table 1:Cytotoxic activity of cyclamin compared to mitomycin C stated in IC_{50} values (μM), (n=2).
Human cells	Cytotoxicity given as IC50 values (μM):	
Human cells	Cyclamin	Mitomycin C
Breast adenocarcinoma SK-BR-3	0.84	20.20
Colon adenocarcinoma HT-29	0.33	0.45
Hepatocellular carcinoma HepG2/C3A	0.51	2.93
Lung carcinoma NCI-H1299	0.64	21.73
Pancreatic carcinoma BXPC-3	0.73	1.74
Prostate carcinoma 22RV1	0.34	2.66
Human normal fibroblasts DMEM	0.32	>100

This indicates that cyclamin is more toxic to the human fibroblasts compared to its toxicity against cancer cell lines. Compared to the chemotherapeutic drug mitomycin C, which has IC50 values ranging from 0.45μM-20.20μM in the cancer cell lines, cyclamin was up to 50 times more toxic for certain cell types when comparing the IC50 values (Table 1). The antioxidant activity of cyclamin was also determined. Cyclamin had an EC50 value of 0.96mM which indicates low antioxidant activity compared to reference compounds catechin (EC50 = 0.009 mM) and ascorbic acid (EC50 = 0.014 mM). The EC50 value represents the potency of a compound by stating the half-maximum concentration of the compound with regards to its concentration where it causes maximum response or effect. Furthermore, it seemed that cyclamin did not have an anticlastogenic effect in the tested cell lines.

Another study found that cyclamin was less toxic to human colorectal cancer cells, from that type HTC 166 and HT-29, compared to the chemotherapeutical drug paclitaxel. This could be concluded from the results that cyclamin had higher IC50 values compared to paclitaxel (Table 2).

Table 2: Cytotoxic activity of cyclamin and paclitaxel against two cancer cell lines stated in IC_{50} values (μM)(n=2).
Cell line	Cytotoxicity given as IC50 values (μM):	
Cell line	Cyclamin	Paclitaxel
HTC 166	9.98 ± 0.41	2.40*10^{−3} ± 1.33
HT-29	8.67 ± 0.54	2.18*10^{−3} ± 0.81

To conclude, cyclamin shows broad toxicity against several cancer cell types, which would make it a promising drug to be used in that respect. However, its toxicity against normal human cells should be investigated further before using it as basis for chemotherapeutic drug to reduce unwanted side effects. For instance, cyclamin has been reported to selectively inhibit the proliferation of liver cancer cells. It is suspected to be related to molecular mechanisms increasing cell membrane permeabilization via targeting cholesterol. With this, it consequently targets the ligand-independent activation of Fas signalling pathway. Only after further investigation it can be decided if cyclamin is suitable for such a medical use.

== Effects on animals ==
Cyclamin has not been thoroughly investigated in terms of its effects on animals, given it is not a widely known compound. However, the effects of Cyclamin on the snail Biomphalaria glabrata (Say) in terms of molluscicidal activity were researched. The lowest concentration showing 100% mortality to snails was 21 mg/l. Beside cyclamin its effect on these snails, no further data is known about its effect on animals.
