= Neuromedin U =

Identifiers
- Symbol: NMU
- NCBI gene: 10874
- HGNC: 7859
- OMIM: 605103
- RefSeq: NM_006681
- UniProt: P48645

Other data
- Locus: Chr. 4 q12
Search for
- Structures: Swiss-model
- Domains: InterPro

Neuromedin U (NmU or NMU) is a neuropeptide found in the brain of humans and other mammals, which has a number of diverse functions including contraction of smooth muscle, regulation of blood pressure, pain perception, appetite, bone growth, and hormone release. It was first isolated from the spinal cord in 1985, and named after its ability to cause smooth muscle contraction in the uterus.

== Structure ==
Neuromedin U is a highly conserved neuropeptide present in many species, existing as multiple isoforms. For example, in humans it is a 25 amino acid peptide (U-25) in rats it is 23-aas long (U-23) and it has been found to be as low as 8-aas long in some mammals. NMU-8 is identical to the C terminus of NMU-25, thus is the most highly conserved region of the entire peptide. The relative contribution of the different isoforms to the biological function of neuromedin U is generally not well understood. Neuromedin U, like many neuroactive peptides, is amidated at the C-terminus, and all isoforms have identical C-terminal heptapeptides.

The sequence of neuromedin U-23 in rats is: YKVNEYQGPVAPSGGFFLFRPRN-(NH2).

== Function ==
The activation of NmU receptors leads to intracellular signal transduction via calcium mobilization, phosphoinositide (or PI) signaling, and the inhibition of cAMP production

NmU will contract smooth muscle only in a tissue- and species-specific manner. Intracerebroventricular (or i.c.v) administration of the neuropeptide mediates stress response and increases both the arterial pressure and heart rate. i.c.v administration of NmU elevates the plasma adrenaline levels, though has no effect on the amount of plasma noradrenaline. It has been suggested that large doses () of NmU inhibits the activity of the paraventricular nucleus of hypothalamus and/or the sympathetic preganglionic neurons, thus controlling the activity.

== Regulation ==
Neuromedin U is mediated by two receptors, peripheral NmUR1 and central nervous system NmUR2. Both receptors are examples of Class A G-protein coupled receptors (or GPCRs) with a distinct distributional pattern. NmUR1 is expressed predominantly in the peripheral nervous system, with highest levels in the gastrointestinal tract, whereas NmUR2 is mostly found in the central nervous system, with greatest expression in the hypothalamus, medulla, and spinal cord.

The discovery of set distribution patterns has begun to allow assignation of specific roles of the two receptor subtypes within the body. What is known for certain is that recombinant NmU receptors will increase the internal calcium concentration, signaling via the MAPK/ERK pathway

== Role in disease ==
=== Cancer ===
Its role in cancer is not yet fully understood, though NmU and its receptor NMUR2 have been shown to be over-expressed in human pancreatic cancers compared to normal cells. Studies also showed NmU serum levels decreased after the tumors were removed, as NmU and its receptor are localized predominantly in cancer cells. Although NmU exerts no effect on cancer cell proliferation, it induces c-Met, a proto-oncogene that encodes the mesenchymal-epithelial transition factor (MET) protein. Increased invasiveness as well as an increased hepatocyte growth factor (HGF)-mediated scattering suggest NmU is also involved in the HGF-c-Met paracrine loop regulating cell migration.

=== Pain perception and stress response ===
The effect of NmU on stress and pain perception pathways has been demonstrated using mice. In contrast to NmU peptide-deficient mice, NmUR2 knockout (KO) mice appeared normal with regard to stress, anxiety, body weight regulation, and food consumption. However, the NmUR2 KO mice exhibit reduced pain sensitivity in both hot plate test and the chronic phase of the formalin test. Furthermore, facilitated excitatory synaptic transmission in spinal dorsal horn neurons, a mechanism by which NmU stimulates pain, did not occur in NmUR2 KO mice. Both NmUR2 expression and NmU-23 binding sites are highly localized to the outer layers of the spinal dorsal horn, and administration of NmU via intracerebroventricular (ICV) injections usually increases pain sensitivity in rats and mice.

The expression of NmUR2 in the paraventricular nucleus of hypothalamus (PVN), a major site for the release of Corticotropin-releasing hormone (CRH), suggests an alternative role in mediating stress response. NmU and its receptors are also abundantly expressed in nociceptive sensory pathways, including the dorsal root ganglia (DRG), spinal cord, and brainstem. In particular, NmU induces hyperalgesia, allodynia, and increased persistent pain after formalin injection. ICV injections of NmU in rats and mice induce behavior responses associated with activation of the nociceptive pathways, for example it will increase plasma levels of corticosterone, and stimulates the release of CRH from hypothalamic explants in vitro. Central administration of NmU also induces expression of key genes in hypothalamic areas associated with stress, as well as stress-related behaviours that can be blocked by CRH antagonist (this is absent from CRH knockout mice).

Certain stress responses are abolished in NmU knockout mice. These results suggest that NmU significantly modulates nociceptive sensory transmission.

== See also ==
- Neuromedin U receptor
- Neuromedin S
