= Streptomyces clavifer =

Scientific classification
- Domain: Bacteria
- Kingdom: Bacillati
- Phylum: Actinomycetota
- Class: Actinomycetes
- Order: Streptomycetales
- Family: Streptomycetaceae
- Genus: Streptomyces
- Species: S. clavifer

Binomial name
- Streptomyces clavifer (Millard and Burr 1926) Waksman 1953 (Approved Lists 1980)

Type strain
- AS 4.1604, CBS 101.27, CGMCC 4.1604, DSM 40843, ETH 16826, ETH 31573, IFO 15398, JCM 5059, KCC S-1059, MS 1479, NBRC 15398, NRRL B-2557

Synonyms
- "Actinomyces clavifer" Millard and Burr 1926

Species of bacterium

Streptomyces clavifer is a bacterium species from the genus of Streptomyces which has been isolated from a Potato. Streptomyces clavifer produces melanostatin.

== See also ==
- List of Streptomyces species
