= Neuromedin S =

Identifiers
- Symbol: NMS
- NCBI gene: 129521
- HGNC: 32203

Other data
- Locus: Chr. 2 q11.2

Neuromedin S is a 36-amino acid neuropeptide found in the brain of humans and other mammals. It is produced in the suprachiasmatic nucleus of the hypothalamus and is related to neuromedin U. It is thought to be involved in regulation of circadian rhythm and also has appetite suppressant effects, as well as regulating the release of several other peptide hormones including vasopressin, luteinizing hormone, and oxytocin.

== See also ==
- Neuromedin U receptor
