= Neuromedin U receptor =

InterPro Family

neuromedin U receptor 1

Identifiers
- Symbol: NMUR1
- Alt. symbols: GPR66
- NCBI gene: 10316
- HGNC: 4518
- OMIM: 604153
- RefSeq: NM_006056
- UniProt: Q9HB89

Other data
- Locus: Chr. 2 q37.1
Search for
- Structures: Swiss-model
- Domains: InterPro

neuromedin U receptor 2

Identifiers
- Symbol: NMUR2
- Alt. symbols: NMU2R
- NCBI gene: 56923
- HGNC: 16454
- OMIM: 605108
- RefSeq: NM_020167
- UniProt: Q9GZQ4

Other data
- Locus: Chr. 5 q33.1
Search for
- Structures: Swiss-model
- Domains: InterPro

The neuromedin U receptors are two G-protein coupled receptors which bind the neuropeptide hormones neuromedin U and neuromedin S. There are two subtypes of the neuromedin U receptor, each encoded by a separate gene (NMUR1, NMUR2).

== Selective Ligands ==
Neuromedin U is an agonist at both the NMU_{1} and NMU_{2} subtypes, while neuromedin S is selective for NMU_{2}, and is a more potent agonist at this subtype than neuromedin U. Several other peptide and non-peptide ligands are also available for the NMU receptors.

=== Agonists ===
Non-selective

- Neuromedin U
- non-peptide NMU modulators

NMU_{2} selective

- Neuromedin S

=== Antagonists ===
NMU_{2} selective

- R-PSOP
