= PE 22-28 =

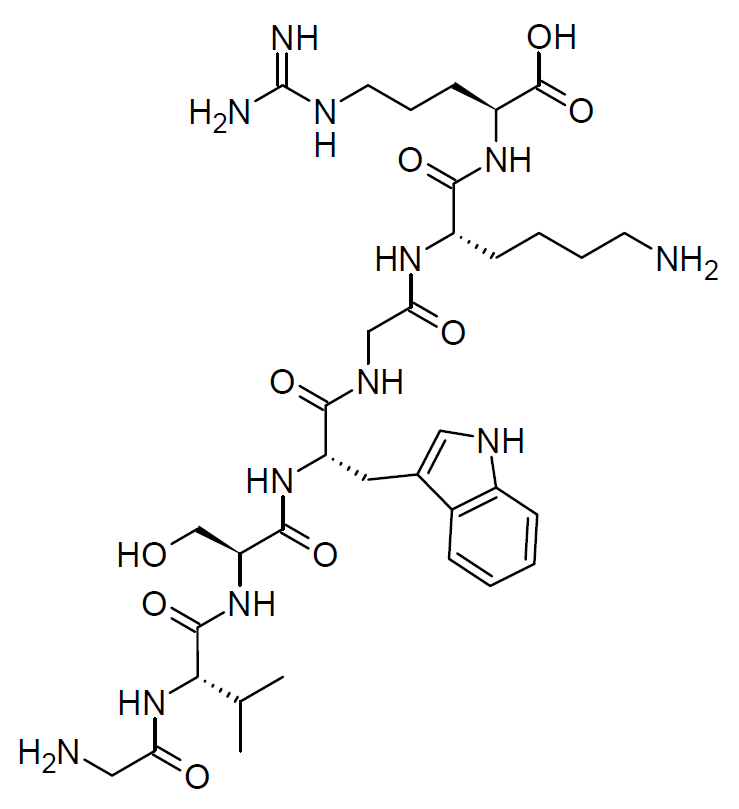

Identifiers
- IUPAC name: (2S)-2-[[(2S)-2-[[2-[[(2S)-2-[[(2S)-2-[[(2S)-2-[(2-aminoacetyl)amino]-3-methylbutanoyl]amino]-3-hydroxypropanoyl]amino]-3-(1H-indol-3-yl)propanoyl]amino]acetyl]amino]-4-methylpentanoyl]amino]-5-(diaminomethylideneamino)pentanoic acid
- CAS Number: 1801959-12-5
- PubChem CID: 165437303
- ChemSpider: 128942433

Chemical and physical data
- Formula: C_{35}H_{56}N_{12}O_{9}
- Molar mass: 788.908 g·mol^{−1}
- 3D model (JSmol): Interactive image
- SMILES: OC(=O)[C@@H](NC(=O)[C@@H](NC(=O)CNC(=O)[C@@H](NC(=O)[C@@H](NC(=O)[C@@H](NC(=O)CN)C(C)C)CO)Cc1c[NH]c2ccccc21)CCCCN)CCCNC(N)=N
- InChI: InChI=1S/C35H55N11O9/c1-18(2)12-24(31(51)43-23(34(54)55)10-7-11-39-35(37)38)42-28(49)16-41-30(50)25(13-20-15-40-22-9-6-5-8-21(20)22)44-32(52)26(17-47)45-33(53)29(19(3)4)46-27(48)14-36/h5-6,8-9,15,18-19,23-26,29,40,47H,7,10-14,16-17,36H2,1-4H3,(H,41,50)(H,42,49)(H,43,51)(H,44,52)(H,45,53)(H,46,48)(H,54,55)(H4,37,38,39)/t23-,24-,25-,26-,29-/m0/s1; Key:CMNBQRXBBJQIOA-YIHYGEMESA-N

PE 22-28 is a heptapeptide with the sequence GVSWGLR or Gly–Val–Ser–Trp–Gly–Leu–Arg. It is a fragment of the endogenous TREK-1 antagonist spadin, and is the smallest fragment identified which shows similar TREK-1 inhibitory activity to spadin itself. It has been investigated as a potential antidepressant.

== See also ==
- Nemifitide
