= Limostatin =

Peptide hormone

Limostatin (from Limos, the Greek goddess of starvation) is a peptide hormone found in Drosophila melanogaster that suppresses the production and release of Insulin. The hormone is important in adaptation to starvation conditions, and represents a mechanism by which insulin is negatively regulated.

== See also ==
- Neuromedin U receptor 1
