= Melanocyte-inhibiting factor =

Chemical compound

Clinical data
- MedlinePlus: a605038
- Routes of administration: IV

Pharmacokinetic data
- Bioavailability: 100% (injected)
- Metabolism: plasma protease enzymes
- Excretion: N/A

Identifiers
- IUPAC name: (S)-N-((S)-1-(2-amino-2-oxoethylamino)-4-methyl-1-oxopentan-2-yl)pyrrolidine-2-carboxamide
- CAS Number: 2002-44-0
- PubChem CID: 92910
- ChemSpider: 83871
- UNII: 3KY24B4Q62
- CompTox Dashboard (EPA): DTXSID20173841
- ECHA InfoCard: 100.016.276

Chemical and physical data
- Formula: C_{13}H_{24}N_{4}O_{3}
- Molar mass: 284.360 g·mol^{−1}
- 3D model (JSmol): Interactive image
- SMILES: NC(CNC([C@H](CC(C)C)NC([C@@H]1CCCN1)=O)=O)=O
- InChI: InChI=1S/C13H24N4O3/c1-8(2)6-10(12(19)16-7-11(14)18)17-13(20)9-4-3-5-15-9/h8-10,15H,3-7H2,1-2H3,(H2,14,18)(H,16,19)(H,17,20)/t9-,10-/m0/s1; Key:NOOJLZTTWSNHOX-UWVGGRQHSA-N

Melanocyte-inhibiting factor (also known as Pro-Leu-Gly-NH_{2}, melanostatin, MSH release–inhibiting hormone, or MIF-1) is an endogenous peptide fragment derived from cleavage of the hormone oxytocin, but having generally different actions in the body. MIF-1 produces multiple effects, both blocking the effects of opioid receptor activation, while at the same time acting as a positive allosteric modulator of the D_{2} and D_{4} dopamine receptor subtypes, as well as inhibiting release of other neuropeptides such as alpha-MSH, and potentiating melatonin activity.

This complex mix of actions produces a profile of antidepressant, nootropic, and anti-Parkinsonian effects when MIF-1 is administered, and it has been investigated for various medical uses. MIF-1 is unusually resistant to metabolism in the bloodstream, and crosses the blood–brain barrier easily, though it is poorly active orally and is usually injected. Several other closely related peptides with important actions in the body include Tyr-MIF-1 and endomorphin-1 and -2.

== See also ==
- Nemifitide
- Doreptide
