= Neuromedin U receptor 2 =

Protein-coding gene in the species Homo sapiens

NMUR2

Identifiers
- Aliases: NMUR2, FM-4, FM4, NMU-R2, NMU2R, TGR-1, TGR1, Neuromedin U receptor 2
- External IDs: OMIM: 605108; MGI: 2441765; GeneCards: NMUR2

Gene location (Human)
Chr.	Chromosome 5 (human)
Band	5q33.1	Start	152,391,546 bp
Band	5q33.1	End	152,433,368 bp

Gene location (Mouse)
Chr.	Chromosome 11 (mouse)
Band	11|11 B1.3	Start	55,915,813 bp
Band	11|11 B1.3	End	55,931,836 bp
RNA expression pattern
Bgee	Human / Mouse (ortholog); Top expressed in: tibialis anterior muscle; testicle; mucosa of ileum; deltoid muscle; corpus callosum; skin of thigh; C1 segment; internal globus pallidus; right testis; right lung / Top expressed in: embryo; submandibular gland; cervix; jejunum; duodenum; skin of abdomen; trachea; stomach; More reference expression data
BioGPS	n/a
Gene ontology
Molecular function	protein binding; signal transducer activity; neuromedin U binding; neuropeptide receptor activity; neuromedin U receptor activity; intracellular calcium activated chloride channel activity; GTP binding; G protein-coupled receptor activity
Cellular component	integral component of membrane; membrane; plasma membrane; intracellular anatomical structure
Biological process	reduction of food intake in response to dietary excess; calcium ion transport; phospholipase C-activating G protein-coupled receptor signaling pathway; activation of phospholipase A2 activity; feeding behavior; inositol phosphate-mediated signaling; regulation of smooth muscle contraction; arachidonic acid secretion; positive regulation of cytosolic calcium ion concentration; cell-cell signaling; response to pain; calcium-mediated signaling; signal transduction; grooming behavior; central nervous system development; G protein-coupled receptor signaling pathway; neuropeptide signaling pathway; ion transmembrane transport; regulation of sensory perception of pain
Sources:Amigo / QuickGO
Orthologs
Databases	NCBI: entry; OMA: entry
Species	Human	Mouse
Entrez	56923	216749
Ensembl	ENSG00000132911	ENSMUSG00000037393
UniProt	Q9GZQ4	Q8BZ39
RefSeq (mRNA)	NM_020167	NM_153079
RefSeq (protein)	NP_064552	NP_694719
Location (UCSC)	Chr 5: 152.39 – 152.43 Mb	Chr 11: 55.92 – 55.93 Mb
PubMed search
- Wikidata
View/Edit Human	View/Edit Mouse

Neuromedin-U receptor 2 is a protein that in humans is encoded by the NMUR2 gene.

== Ligands ==
=== Agonists ===
- synephrine

== See also ==
- Neuromedin U receptor
