= Neuromedin U receptor 1 =

Protein-coding gene in the species Homo sapiens

NMUR1

Identifiers
- Aliases: NMUR1, (FM-3), FM-3, FM3, GPC-R, GPR66, NMU1R, Neuromedin U receptor 1
- External IDs: OMIM: 604153; MGI: 1341898; GeneCards: NMUR1

Gene location (Human)
Chr.	Chromosome 2 (human)
Band	2q37.1	Start	231,523,187 bp
Band	2q37.1	End	231,530,445 bp

Gene location (Mouse)
Chr.	Chromosome 1 (mouse)
Band	1|1 C5	Start	86,314,025 bp
Band	1|1 C5	End	86,353,950 bp
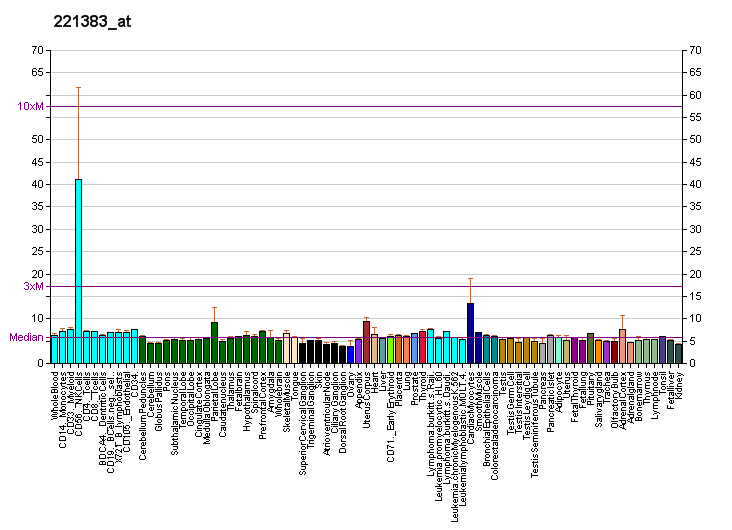
RNA expression pattern
Bgee	Human / Mouse (ortholog); Top expressed in: granulocyte; gonad; testicle; blood; right lung; body of pancreas; spleen; subcutaneous adipose tissue; monocyte; right uterine tube / Top expressed in: right ventricle; seminiferous tubule; duodenum; cerebellar cortex; jejunum; ileum; respiratory system; lower respiratory tract; lung; foregut; More reference expression data
BioGPS	More reference expression data
Gene ontology
Molecular function	neuromedin U receptor activity; G protein-coupled receptor activity; signal transducer activity; neuropeptide receptor activity; neuromedin U binding
Cellular component	integral component of membrane; plasma membrane; integral component of plasma membrane; membrane; intracellular anatomical structure
Biological process	smooth muscle contraction; G protein-coupled receptor signaling pathway; phospholipase C-activating G protein-coupled receptor signaling pathway; chloride transport; inositol phosphate-mediated signaling; activation of phospholipase C activity; calcium ion transport; calcium-mediated signaling; signal transduction; neuropeptide signaling pathway
Sources:Amigo / QuickGO
Orthologs
Databases	NCBI: entry; OMA: entry
Species	Human	Mouse
Entrez	10316	14767
Ensembl	ENSG00000171596	ENSMUSG00000026237
UniProt	Q9HB89	O55040
RefSeq (mRNA)	NM_006056	NM_010341; NM_001319227
RefSeq (protein)	NP_006047	NP_001306156; NP_034471
Location (UCSC)	Chr 2: 231.52 – 231.53 Mb	Chr 1: 86.31 – 86.35 Mb
PubMed search
- Wikidata
View/Edit Human	View/Edit Mouse

Neuromedin-U receptor 1 is a protein that in humans is encoded by the NMUR1 gene.

== See also ==
- Neuromedin U receptor
- Limostatin
