= Neuromedin B =

NMB

Identifiers
- Aliases: NMB, Neuromedin B, Neuromedin-B, Neuromedin-Beta
- External IDs: OMIM: 162340; MGI: 1915289; GeneCards: NMB
Available structures
PDB	Ortholog search: PDBe RCSB
PDB	List of PDB id codes 1C98, 1C9A

Gene location (Human)
Chr.	Chromosome 15 (human)
Band	15q25.2	Start	84,655,129 bp
Band	15q25.2	End	84,658,563 bp

Gene location (Mouse)
Chr.	Chromosome 7 (mouse)
Band	7|7 D3	Start	80,551,975 bp
Band	7|7 D3	End	80,554,824 bp
RNA expression pattern
Bgee	Human / Mouse (ortholog); Top expressed in: beta cell; adipose tissue; abdominal fat; subcutaneous adipose tissue; right adrenal gland; gonad; left lobe of thyroid gland; left adrenal cortex; right lobe of thyroid gland; hypothalamus / Top expressed in: lumbar spinal ganglion; olfactory bulb; granulocyte; endothelial cell of lymphatic vessel; embryo; morula; thymus; decidua; intercostal muscle; cumulus cell; More reference expression data
BioGPS	n/a
Gene ontology
Molecular function	protein binding; hormone activity; neuromedin B receptor binding
Cellular component	extracellular region; neuron projection
Biological process	cell-cell signaling; neuropeptide signaling pathway; signal transduction; regulation of signaling receptor activity; G protein-coupled receptor signaling pathway; positive regulation of cytosolic calcium ion concentration; positive regulation of cell population proliferation; glucose homeostasis; positive regulation of hormone secretion; negative regulation of hormone secretion; arachidonic acid secretion
Sources:Amigo / QuickGO
Orthologs
Databases	NCBI: entry; OMA: entry
Species	Human	Mouse
Entrez	4828	68039
Ensembl	ENSG00000197696	ENSMUSG00000025723
UniProt	P08949	Q9CR53
RefSeq (mRNA)	NM_205858; NM_021077	NM_001291280; NM_026523
RefSeq (protein)	NP_066563; NP_995580	NP_001278209; NP_080799
Location (UCSC)	Chr 15: 84.66 – 84.66 Mb	Chr 7: 80.55 – 80.55 Mb
PubMed search
- Wikidata
View/Edit Human	View/Edit Mouse

Neuromedin B (NMB) is a bombesin-related peptide in mammals. It was originally purified from pig spinal cord, and later shown to be present in human central nervous system and gastrointestinal tract.

== Sequence ==
The sequence of the C-terminal decapeptide is highly conserved across mammalian species: GNLWATGHFM-(NH2); this decapeptide is sometimes noted as neuromedin B, but it is more accurately described as neuromedin B 23-32. The sequence of neuromedin B (in rat) is: TPFSWDLPEPRSRASKIRVHPRGNLWATGHFM-(NH2). The (NH2) here indicates a post-translational modification -- alpha amidation of the carboxy terminus.

== Function ==
Figure 1: NMB, 7-TMR receptor and G-protein

Figure 2 : Signal Cascade after NMB binding

Neuromedin regulates the following functions:

- exocrine and endocrine secretions
- cell growth
- body temperature
- blood pressure and glucose level
- sneezing

== Neuromedin signaling pathway ==
NMB acts by binding to its high affinity cell surface receptor, neuromedin B receptor (NMBR). This receptor is a G protein-coupled receptor with seven transmembrane spanning regions, hence the receptor is also denoted as a 7-transmembrane receptor (7-TMR). Upon binding several intracellular signaling pathways are triggered (see Figure 2).

When NMB binds to its 7-TMR, the heterotrimeric G protein that is attached to the receptor is activated. The G-protein is called heterotrimeric because it consists of 3 polypeptides: α subunit, β subunit, and γ subunit. In the activated NMBR/G-protein complex, there occurs an exchange of GTP for GDP bound to G-α subunit. The G-α subunit, in turn, dissociated form the G-βγ subunits. The free G-α inactivates adenylate cyclase (AC), which, in turn, catalyzes the conversion of ATP to cAMP, the latter of which functioning as a second messenger. cAMP activates of the enzyme Protein Kinase A (PKA). PKA enters the nucleus and activates the cAMP response element-binding protein. The activated CREB binds along with CREB binding protein, co-activator to the CRE region of the DNA in the nucleus. CREB and CBP are held together by leucine zippers. CRE is the control that activates number of growth factors, and thus cell proliferation and some anti-apoptotic genes. In the brain, CREB plays a role in long-term memory and learning.
