= Gastrin-releasing peptide receptor =

Protein-coding gene in the species Homo sapiens

GRPR

Identifiers
- Aliases: GRPR, BB2, gastrin releasing peptide receptor, BB2R, BRS2
- External IDs: OMIM: 305670; MGI: 95836; GeneCards: GRPR

Gene location (Human)
Chr.	X chromosome (human)
Band	Xp22.2	Start	16,123,565 bp
Band	Xp22.2	End	16,153,518 bp

Gene location (Mouse)
Chr.	X chromosome (mouse)
Band	X F5|X 75.63 cM	Start	162,296,900 bp
Band	X F5|X 75.63 cM	End	162,332,673 bp
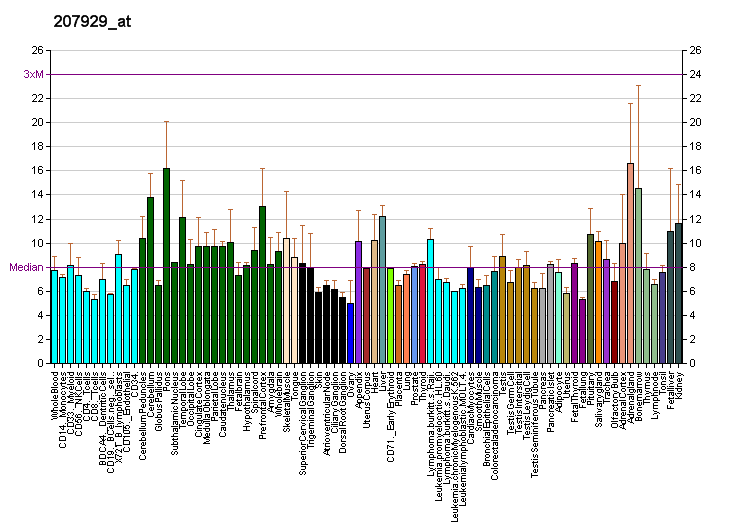
RNA expression pattern
Bgee	Human / Mouse (ortholog); Top expressed in: gonad; testicle; buccal mucosa cell; body of pancreas; pancreatic ductal cell; stromal cell of endometrium; deltoid muscle; epithelium of colon; gastric mucosa; smooth muscle tissue / Top expressed in: lumbar spinal ganglion; lumbar subsegment of spinal cord; supraoptic nucleus; embryo; dentate gyrus of hippocampal formation granule cell; vestibular membrane of cochlear duct; ankle joint; tibiofemoral joint; genital tubercle; suprachiasmatic nucleus; More reference expression data
BioGPS	More reference expression data
Gene ontology
Molecular function	signal transducer activity; G protein-coupled receptor activity; G protein-coupled peptide receptor activity; neuropeptide receptor activity; neuropeptide binding
Cellular component	membrane; integral component of membrane; plasma membrane; integral component of plasma membrane
Biological process	regulation of cell population proliferation; signal transduction; cell population proliferation; G protein-coupled receptor signaling pathway; psychomotor behavior; response to external biotic stimulus; phospholipase C-activating G protein-coupled receptor signaling pathway; neuropeptide signaling pathway; social behavior; motor behavior; learning or memory
Sources:Amigo / QuickGO
Orthologs
Databases	NCBI: entry; OMA: entry
Species	Human	Mouse
Entrez	2925	14829
Ensembl	ENSG00000126010	ENSMUSG00000031364
UniProt	P30550	P21729
RefSeq (mRNA)	NM_005314	NM_008177
RefSeq (protein)	NP_005305; NP_005305.1	NP_032203
Location (UCSC)	Chr X: 16.12 – 16.15 Mb	Chr X: 162.3 – 162.33 Mb
PubMed search
- Wikidata
View/Edit Human	View/Edit Mouse

The gastrin-releasing peptide receptor (GRPR), now properly known as BB_{2} is a G protein-coupled receptor whose endogenous ligand is gastrin releasing peptide. In humans it is highly expressed in the pancreas and is also expressed in the stomach, adrenal cortex and brain.

Gastrin-releasing peptide (GRP) regulates numerous functions of the gastrointestinal and central nervous systems, including release of gastrointestinal hormones, smooth muscle cell contraction, and epithelial cell proliferation and is a potent mitogen for neoplastic tissues. The effects of GRP are mediated through the gastrin-releasing peptide receptor. This receptor is a glycosylated, 7-transmembrane G-protein coupled receptor that activates the phospholipase C signaling pathway. The receptor is aberrantly expressed in numerous cancers such as those of the lung, colon, and prostate. An individual with autism and multiple exostoses was found to have a balanced translocation between chromosome 8 and an X chromosome breakpoint located within the gastrin-releasing peptide receptor gene.

The transcription factor CREB is a regulator of human GRP-R expression in colon cancer.

Activation MOR1D‐GRPR heteromers in the spinal cord mediate the common troublesome opioid-induced itch.
