= Neuromedin B receptor =

Protein-coding gene in the species Homo sapiens

NMBR

Identifiers
- Aliases: NMBR, BB1, NMB-R, neuromedin B receptor, BB1R, BRS1
- External IDs: OMIM: 162341; MGI: 1100525; GeneCards: NMBR

Gene location (Human)
Chr.	Chromosome 6 (human)
Band	6q24.1	Start	142,058,330 bp
Band	6q24.1	End	142,147,122 bp
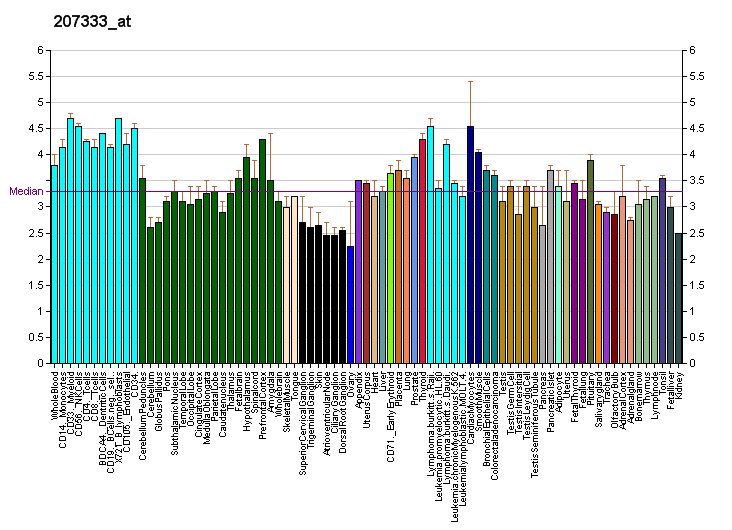
RNA expression pattern
Bgee	Human / Mouse (ortholog); Top expressed in: left testis; right testis; prefrontal cortex; olfactory zone of nasal mucosa; ganglionic eminence; right uterine tube; caudate nucleus; gonad; putamen; nucleus accumbens / n/a; More reference expression data
BioGPS	More reference expression data
Gene ontology
Molecular function	G protein-coupled peptide receptor activity; signal transducer activity; G protein-coupled receptor activity; bombesin receptor activity
Cellular component	integral component of plasma membrane; membrane; integral component of membrane; plasma membrane; cytosol
Biological process	phospholipase C-activating G protein-coupled receptor signaling pathway; bombesin receptor signaling pathway; signal transduction; G protein-coupled receptor signaling pathway
Sources:Amigo / QuickGO
Orthologs
Databases	NCBI: entry; OMA: entry
Species	Human	Mouse
Entrez	4829	18101
Ensembl	ENSG00000135577	ENSMUSG00000019865
UniProt	P28336	O54799
RefSeq (mRNA)	NM_002511; NM_001324307; NM_001324308	NM_008703
RefSeq (protein)	NP_001311236; NP_001311237; NP_002502	NP_032729
Location (UCSC)	Chr 6: 142.06 – 142.15 Mb	n/a
PubMed search
- Wikidata
View/Edit Human	View/Edit Mouse

The neuromedin B receptor (NMBR), now known as BB_{1} is a G protein-coupled receptor whose endogenous ligand is neuromedin B. In humans, this protein is encoded by the NMBR gene.

Neuromedin B receptor binds neuromedin B, a potent mitogen and growth factor for normal and neoplastic lung and for gastrointestinal epithelial tissue.
