= Gastrin-releasing peptide =

GRP
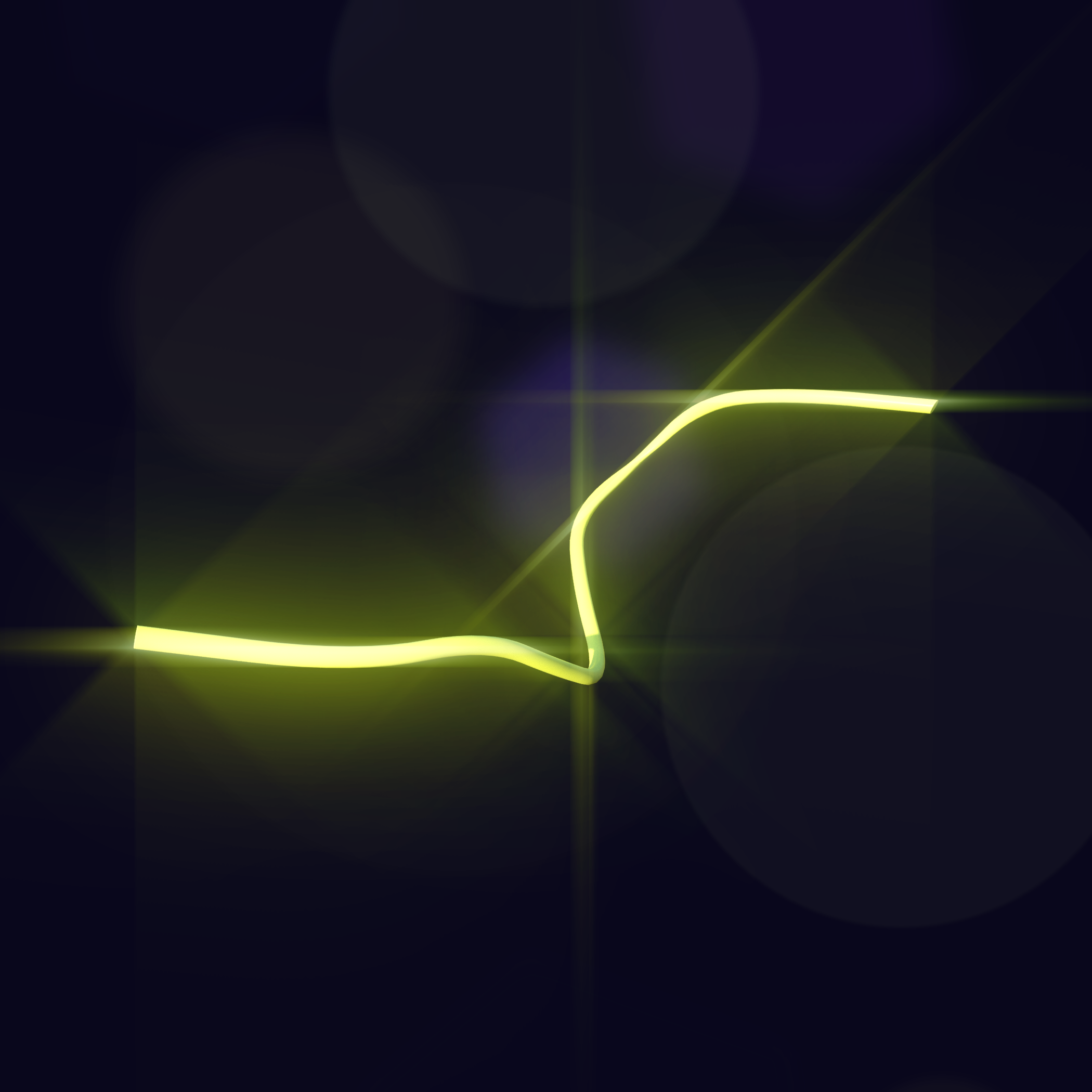

Identifiers
- Aliases: GRP, BN, GRP-10, preproprogastrin releasing peptide
- External IDs: OMIM: 137260; MGI: 95833; GeneCards: GRP
Available structures
PDB	Ortholog search: PDBe RCSB
PDB	List of PDB id codes 2N0B, 2N0C, 2N0D, 2N0E, 2N0F, 2N0G, 2N0H

Gene location (Human)
Chr.	Chromosome 18 (human)
Band	18q21.32	Start	59,220,158 bp
Band	18q21.32	End	59,230,774 bp

Gene location (Mouse)
Chr.	Chromosome 18 (mouse)
Band	18 E1|18 38.98 cM	Start	66,005,891 bp
Band	18 E1|18 38.98 cM	End	66,019,667 bp
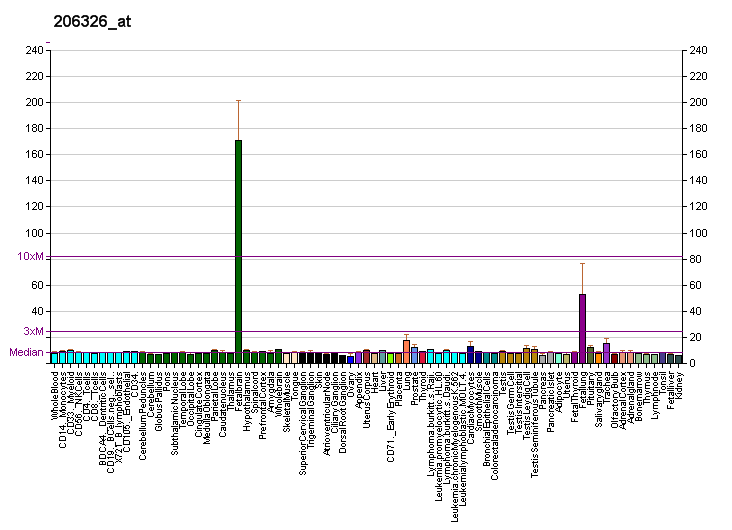
RNA expression pattern
Bgee	Human / Mouse (ortholog); Top expressed in: testicle; gonad; hair follicle; gastric mucosa; decidua; cartilage tissue; male germ cell; sperm; epithelium of lactiferous gland; lactiferous duct / Top expressed in: subiculum; lumbar subsegment of spinal cord; suprachiasmatic nucleus; barrel cortex; ventral tegmental area; hippocampus proper; external carotid artery; dentate gyrus of hippocampal formation granule cell; embryo; dorsomedial hypothalamic nucleus; More reference expression data
BioGPS	More reference expression data
Gene ontology
Molecular function	signaling receptor binding; neuropeptide hormone activity
Cellular component	extracellular region; extracellular space; secretory granule lumen; cytoplasmic vesicle
Biological process	neuropeptide signaling pathway; signal transduction; social behavior; psychomotor behavior; response to external biotic stimulus; positive regulation of peptide hormone secretion; positive regulation of phospholipase C-activating G protein-coupled receptor signaling pathway; regulation of signaling receptor activity; G protein-coupled receptor signaling pathway
Sources:Amigo / QuickGO
Orthologs
Databases	NCBI: entry; OMA: entry
Species	Human	Mouse
Entrez	2922	225642
Ensembl	ENSG00000134443	ENSMUSG00000024517
UniProt	P07492	Q8R1I2
RefSeq (mRNA)	NM_001012512; NM_001012513; NM_002091	NM_175012
RefSeq (protein)	NP_002082; NP_001012531; NP_001012530	NP_778177
Location (UCSC)	Chr 18: 59.22 – 59.23 Mb	Chr 18: 66.01 – 66.02 Mb
PubMed search
- Wikidata
View/Edit Human	View/Edit Mouse

Gastrin-releasing peptide GRP, is a neuropeptide, a regulatory molecule encoded in the human by the GRP gene. GRP has been implicated in a number of physiological and pathophysiological processes. Most notably, GRP stimulates the release of gastrin from the G cells of the stomach.

GRP encodes a number of bombesin-like peptides. Its 148-amino acid preproprotein, following cleavage of a signal peptide, is further processed to produce either the 27-amino acid gastrin-releasing peptide or the 10-amino acid neuromedin C. These smaller peptides regulate numerous functions of the gastrointestinal and central nervous systems, including release of gastrointestinal hormones, smooth muscle cell contraction, and epithelial cell proliferation.

== Gene ==
GRP is located on chromosome 18q21. PreproGRP (the unprocessed form of GRP) is encoded in three exons separated by two introns. Alternative splicing results in multiple transcript variants encoding different isoforms.

== Synthesis ==
PreproGRP begins with signal peptidase cleavage to generate the pro-gastrin-releasing-peptide (proGRP), which is then processed by proteolytic cleavages, to form smaller GRP peptides.

These smaller peptides are released by the post-ganglionic fibers of the vagus nerve, which innervate the G cells of the stomach and stimulate them to release gastrin. GRP regulates numerous functions of the gastrointestinal and central nervous systems, including release of gastrointestinal hormones, smooth muscle cell contraction, and epithelial cell proliferation.

== Function ==
Gastrin-releasing peptide is a regulatory human peptide that elicits gastrin release and regulates gastric acid secretion and enteric motor function. The post-ganglionic fibers of the vagus nerve that innervate bombesin/GRP neurons of the stomach release GRP, which stimulates the G cells to release gastrin.

GRP is also involved in the biology of the circadian system, playing a role in the signaling of light to the master circadian oscillator in the suprachiasmatic nuclei of the hypothalamus.

Furthermore, GRP seems to mediate certain aspects of stress. This is the reason for the observed fact that atropine does not block the vagal effect on gastrin release.

== Clinical significance ==
Gastrin-releasing peptide and neuromedin C, it is postulated, play a role in human cancers of the lung, colon, stomach, pancreas, breast, and prostate.
