= Bombesin =

Names
- Other names Pyr-Gln-Arg-Leu-Gly-Asn-Gln-Trp-Ala-Val-Gly-His-Leu-Met-NH2

Identifiers
CAS Number	31362-50-2
3D model (JSmol)	Interactive image
ChEMBL	ChEMBL437027
ChemSpider	17290379
IUPHAR/BPS	616
PubChem CID	16133800
UNII	PX9AZU7QPK
CompTox Dashboard (EPA)	DTXSID1037149
- InChI: InChI=1S/C71H110N24O18S/c1-34(2)24-47(92-62(105)43(14-11-22-79-71(76)77)89-64(107)45(15-18-52(72)96)90-63(106)44-17-20-55(99)85-44)61(104)81-31-56(100)87-51(28-54(74)98)69(112)91-46(16-19-53(73)97)65(108)94-49(26-38-29-80-41-13-10-9-12-40(38)41)66(109)84-37(7)60(103)95-58(36(5)6)70(113)82-32-57(101)86-50(27-39-30-78-33-83-39)68(111)93-48(25-35(3)4)67(110)88-42(59(75)102)21-23-114-8/h9-10,12-13,29-30,33-37,42-51,58,80H,11,14-28,31-32H2,1-8H3,(H2,72,96)(H2,73,97)(H2,74,98)(H2,75,102)(H,78,83)(H,81,104)(H,82,113)(H,84,109)(H,85,99)(H,86,101)(H,87,100)(H,88,110)(H,89,107)(H,90,106)(H,91,112)(H,92,105)(H,93,111)(H,94,108)(H,95,103)(H4,76,77,79)/t37-,42-,43-,44-,45-,46-,47-,48-,49-,50-,51-,58-/m0/s1 Key: QXZBMSIDSOZZHK-DOPDSADYSA-N; InChI=1/C71H110N24O18S/c1-34(2)24-47(92-62(105)43(14-11-22-79-71(76)77)89-64(107)45(15-18-52(72)96)90-63(106)44-17-20-55(99)85-44)61(104)81-31-56(100)87-51(28-54(74)98)69(112)91-46(16-19-53(73)97)65(108)94-49(26-38-29-80-41-13-10-9-12-40(38)41)66(109)84-37(7)60(103)95-58(36(5)6)70(113)82-32-57(101)86-50(27-39-30-78-33-83-39)68(111)93-48(25-35(3)4)67(110)88-42(59(75)102)21-23-114-8/h9-10,12-13,29-30,33-37,42-51,58,80H,11,14-28,31-32H2,1-8H3,(H2,72,96)(H2,73,97)(H2,74,98)(H2,75,102)(H,78,83)(H,81,104)(H,82,113)(H,84,109)(H,85,99)(H,86,101)(H,87,100)(H,88,110)(H,89,107)(H,90,106)(H,91,112)(H,92,105)(H,93,111)(H,94,108)(H,95,103)(H4,76,77,79)/t37-,42-,43-,44-,45-,46-,47-,48-,49-,50-,51-,58-/m0/s1 Key: QXZBMSIDSOZZHK-DOPDSADYBX
- SMILES: [H]/N=C(\N)/NCCC[C@@H](C(=O)N[C@@H](CC(C)C)C(=O)NCC(=O)N[C@@H](CC(=O)N)C(=O)N[C@@H](CCC(=O)N)C(=O)N[C@@H](Cc1c[nH]c2c1cccc2)C(=O)N[C@@H](C)C(=O)N[C@@H](C(C)C)C(=O)NCC(=O)N[C@@H](Cc3c[nH]cn3)C(=O)N[C@@H](CC(C)C)C(=O)N[C@@H](CCSC)C(=O)N)NC(=O)[C@H](CCC(=O)N)NC(=O)[C@@H]4CCC(=O)N4

Properties
Chemical formula	C_{71}H_{110}N_{24}O_{18}S
Molar mass	1619.85
- Except where otherwise noted, data are given for materials in their standard state (at 25 °C [77 °F], 100 kPa). verify (what is ?) Infobox references

Bombesin is a 14-amino acid peptide originally isolated from the skin of the European fire-bellied toad (Bombina bombina) by Vittorio Erspamer et al. and named after its source. It has two known homologs in mammals called neuromedin B and gastrin-releasing peptide. It stimulates gastrin release from G cells. It activates three different G-protein-coupled receptors known as BBR1, -2, and -3. It also activates these receptors in the brain. Together with cholecystokinin, it is the second major source of negative feedback signals that stop eating behaviour.

Bombesin is also a tumor marker for small cell carcinoma of lung, gastric cancer, pancreatic cancer, and neuroblastoma.

== Receptors ==
The anuran BB_{4} receptor homologue is termed frog BB_{4} (fBB_{4}). Iwabuchi et al. 2003 discovered a chicken (Gallus domesticus) receptor which is homologous to both the mammalian BB_{3} and fBB_{4} and so they named it chBRS-3.5.

== Effects ==
Erspamer 1988 finds bombesin has a similar effect on the chicken to ranatensin, unreliably increasing or decreasing blood pressure.

== See also ==
- Gastrin-releasing peptide
- Neuromedin B
- Neuromedin U
