= List of signaling peptide/protein receptor modulators =

This is a list of signaling peptide/protein receptor modulators

== Adiponectin ==
=== AdipoR_{1} ===
- Agonists: Peptide: Adiponectin
- ADP-355
- ADP-399; Non-peptide: AdipoRon
- (–)-Arctigenin
- Arctiin
- Gramine
- Matairesinol
- Antagonists: Peptide: ADP-400

=== AdipoR_{2} ===
- Agonists: Peptide: Adiponectin
- ADP-355
- ADP-399; Non-peptide: AdipoRon
- Deoxyschizandrin
- Parthenolide
- Syringing
- Taxifoliol
- Antagonists: Peptide: ADP-400

== Angiotensin ==
- See here instead.

== Bradykinin ==
- Agonists: Bradykinin
- Kallidin
- Antagonists: FR-173657
- Icatibant
- LF22-0542

== Calcitonin gene-related peptide receptor ==
- Agonists: Amylin
- CGRP
- Pramlintide
- Antagonists: Atogepant
- BI 44370 TA
- CGRP (8-37)
- MK-3207
- Olcegepant
- Rimegepant
- SB-268262
- Telcagepant
- Ubrogepant
- Antibodies: Eptinezumab
- Erenumab
- Fremanezumab
- Galcanezumab

== Cholecystokinin ==
=== CCK_{A} ===
- Agonists: Cholecystokinin
- Antagonists: Amiglumide
- Asperlicin
- Devazepide
- Dexloxiglumide
- Lintitript
- Lorglumide
- Loxiglumide
- Pranazepide
- Proglumide
- Tarazepide
- Tomoglumide

=== CCK_{B} ===
- Agonists: Cholecystokinin
- CCK-4
- Gastrin
- Pentagastrin (CCK-5)
- Antagonists: Ceclazepide
- CI-988 (PD-134308)
- Itriglumide
- L-365,360
- Netazepide
- Proglumide
- Spiroglumide

=== Unsorted ===
- Antagonists: Nastorazepide

== Corticotropin-releasing hormone receptor ==
=== CRF_{1} ===
- Agonists: Cortagine
- Corticorelin
- Corticotropin-releasing hormone
- Sauvagine
- Stressin I
- Urocortin
- Antagonists: Antalarmin
- Astressin-B
- CP-154,526
- Emicerfont
- Hypericin
- LWH-234
- NBI-27914
- NBI-74788
- Pexacerfont
- R-121919
- TS-041
- Verucerfont

=== CRF_{2} ===
- Agonists: Corticorelin
- Corticotropin-releasing hormone
- Sauvagine
- Urocortin
- Antagonists: Astressin-B

== Cytokine ==
See here instead.

== Endothelin ==
- Agonists: Endothelin 1
- Endothelin 2
- Endothelin 3
- IRL-1620
- Sarafotoxin
- Antagonists: A-192621
- Ambrisentan
- Aprocitentan
- Atrasentan
- Avosentan
- Bosentan
- BQ-123
- BQ-788
- Clazosentan
- Darusentan
- Edonentan
- Enrasentan
- Fandosentan
- Feloprentan
- Macitentan
- Nebentan
- Sitaxentan
- Sparsentan
- Tezosentan
- Zibotentan

== Galanin ==
=== GAL_{1} ===
- Agonists: Galanin
- Galanin (1-15)
- Galanin-like peptide
- Galmic
- Galnon
- NAX 810-2
- Antagonists: C7
- Dithiepine-1,1,4,4-tetroxide
- Galantide (M15)
- M32
- M35
- M40
- SCH-202596

=== GAL_{2} ===
- Agonists: Galanin
- Galanin (1-15)
- Galanin (2-11)
- Galanin-like peptide
- Galmic
- Galnon
- J18
- NAX 810-2
- Antagonists: C7
- Galantide (M15)
- M32
- M35
- M40
- M871

=== GAL_{3} ===
- Agonists: Galanin
- Galanin (1-15)
- Galmic
- Galnon
- Antagonists: C7
- Galantide (M15)
- GalR3ant
- HT-2157
- M32
- M35
- M40
- SNAP-37889
- SNAP-398299

== Ghrelin/GHS ==
- See here instead.

== GH ==
- See here instead.

== GHRH ==
- See here instead.

== GLP ==
=== GLP-1 ===
- Agonists: Albiglutide
- Beinaglutide
- Dulaglutide
- Efpeglenatide
- Exenatide
- GLP-1
- Langlenatide
- Liraglutide
- Lixisenatide
- Oxyntomodulin
- Pegapamodutide
- Semaglutide
- Taspoglutide

=== GLP-2 ===
- Agonists: Apraglutide
- Elsiglutide
- Glepaglutide
- GLP-2
- Teduglutide

=== Others ===
- Propeptides: Preproglucagon
- Proglucagon

== Glucagon ==
- Agonists: Dasiglucagon
- Glucagon
- Oxyntomodulin
- Antagonists: Adomeglivant
- L-168,049
- LGD-6972
- Propeptides: Preproglucagon
- Proglucagon

== GnRH ==
- See here instead.

== Gonadotropin ==
- See here instead.

== Growth factor ==
- See here instead.

== Insulin ==
- Agonists: Chaetochromin (4548-G05)
- Insulin-like growth factor 1
- Insulin-like growth factor 2
- Insulin
- Insulin aspart
- Insulin degludec
- Insulin detemir
- Insulin glargine
- Insulin glulisine
- Insulin lispro
- Mecasermin
- Mecasermin rinfabate
- Antagonists: BMS-754807
- S661
- S961
- Kinase inhibitors: Linsitinib
- Antibodies: Xentuzumab (against IGF-1 and IGF-2)

== Kisspeptin ==
- Agonists: Kisspeptin
- Kisspeptin-10
- Antagonists: Kisspeptin-234

== Leptin ==
- Agonists: Leptin
- Metreleptin

== Melanin-concentrating hormone receptor ==
=== MCH_{1} ===
- Agonists: Melanin-concentrating hormone
- Antagonists: ATC-0065
- ATC-0175
- GW-803430
- NGD-4715
- SNAP-7941
- SNAP-94847

=== MCH_{2} ===
- Agonists: Melanin-concentrating hormone

== Melanocortin ==
- See here instead.

== mTOR ==
- Activators: beta-Hydroxy beta-methylbutyric acid
- Hydroxynorketamine
- Leucine
- NV-5138
- Inhibitors: Rapalogs: Everolimus
- Ridaforolimus
- Sirolimus (Rapamycin)
- Temsirolimus
- Umirolimus
- Zotarolimus; ATP-competitive / indirect: Berberine
- Curcumin
- Dactolisib
- EF-24
- Epigallocatechin gallate
- HY-124798
- NV-5440
- Pterostilbene
- Quercetin
- Resveratrol
- Sapanisertib
- Torin-1
- WYE-687
- XL-388

== Neuropeptide FF ==
- Agonists: Neuropeptide AF
- Neuropeptide FF
- Neuropeptide SF (RFRP-1)
- Neuropeptide VF (RFRP-3)
- Antagonists: BIBP-3226
- RF9

== Neuropeptide S ==
- Agonists: Neuropeptide S
- Antagonists: ML-154
- SHA-68

== Neuropeptide Y ==
=== Y_{1} ===
- Agonists: Neuropeptide Y
- Peptide YY
- Antagonists: BIBO-3304
- BIBP-3226
- BVD-10
- GR-231118
- PD-160170

=== Y_{2} ===
- Agonists: 2-Thiouridine 5'-triphosphate
- Neuropeptide Y
- Neuropeptide Y (13-36)
- Peptide YY
- Peptide YY (3-36)
- Antagonists: BIIE-0246
- JNJ-5207787
- SF-11

=== Y_{4} ===
- Agonists: GR-231118
- Neuropeptide Y
- Pancreatic polypeptide
- Peptide YY
- Antagonists: UR-AK49

=== Y_{5} ===
- Agonists: BWX-46
- Neuropeptide Y
- Peptide YY
- Antagonists: CGP-71683
- FMS-586
- L-152,804
- Lu AA-33810
- MK-0557
- NTNCB
- Velneperit (S-2367)

== Neurotensin ==
=== NTS_{1} ===
- Agonists:
  - Neurotensin
  - Neuromedin N
- Antagonists:
  - Meclinertant
  - SR-142948

=== NTS_{2} ===
- Agonists:
  - Neurotensin
- Antagonists:
  - Levocabastine
  - SR-142948

== Opioid ==
- See here instead.

== Orexin ==
=== OX_{1} ===
- Agonists: Orexin (A, B)
- Antagonists: ACT-335827
- ACT-462206
- Almorexant
- Filorexant
- Lemborexant
- Nemorexant
- RTIOX-276
- SB-334867
- SB-408124
- SB-649868
- Suvorexant
- TCS-1102

=== OX_{2} ===
- Agonists: Orexin (A, B)
- SB-668875
- Antagonists: ACT-335827
- ACT-462206
- Almorexant
- EMPA
- Filorexant
- JNJ-10397049
- Lemborexant
- MK-1064
- SB-649868
- Seltorexant
- Suvorexant
- TCS-1102
- TCS-OX2-29

== Oxytocin ==
- See here instead.

== Prolactin ==
- Agonists: Growth hormone
- Human placental lactogen
- Placental growth hormone (growth hormone variant)
- Prolactin
- S179D-hPRL
- Somatotropin
- Antagonists: Δ1–9-G129R-hPRL
- Δ1–14-G129R-hPRL
- G120K-hGH
- G129R-hPRL
- Prolactin modulators: Prolactin inhibitors: D_{2} receptor agonists (e.g., bromocriptine, cabergoline); Prolactin releasers: D_{2} receptor antagonists (e.g., domperidone, metoclopramide, risperidone)
- Estrogens (e.g., estradiol)
- Progestogens (e.g., progesterone)

== PTH ==
- Agonists: Abaloparatide
- Parathyroid hormone
- Parathyroid hormone-related protein (PTHrP)
- Semparatide
- Teriparatide

== Relaxin ==
- Agonists: Insulin-like factor 3
- Relaxin (1, 2, 3)
- Serelaxin

== Somatostatin ==
- See here instead.

== Tachykinin ==
- See here instead.

== TRH ==
- Agonists: Azetirelin
- Fertirelin
- Montirelin
- Orotirelin
- Posatirelin
- Protirelin
- Rovatirelin
- Taltirelin
- TRH (TRF)

== TSH ==
- Agonists: Thyrotropin alfa
- TSH (thyrotropin)

== Vasopressin ==
- See here instead.

== VIP/PACAP ==
=== VIPR_{1} ===
- Agonists: Peptide: Bay 55-9837
- LBT-3393
- PACAP
- VIP

=== VIPR_{2} ===
- Agonists: Peptide: LBT-3627
- PACAP
- VIP

=== PAC_{1} ===
- Agonists: PACAP
- PACAP (1-27)
- PACAP (1-38)
- Antagonists: PACAP (6-38)

=== Unsorted ===
- PHI
- PHM
- PHV

== Others ==
- Endogenous: Adrenomedullin
- Apelin
- Asprosin
- Bombesin
- Calcitonin
- Carnosine
- CART
- CLIP
- DSIP
- Enteroglucagon
- Formyl peptide
- GALP
- GIP
- GRP
- Integrin ligands (collagens, fibrinogen, fibronectin, laminins, ICAM-1, ICAM-2, osteopontin, VCAM-1, vitronectin)
- Kininogens
- Motilin
- Natriuretic peptides (ANP, BNP, CNP, urodilatin)
- Nesfatin-1
- Neuromedin B
- Neuromedin N
- Neuromedin S
- Neuromedin U
- Obestatin
- Osteocalcin
- Resistin
- Secretin
- Thymopoietin
- Thymosins
- Thymulin
- Urotensin-II
- VGF
- Exogenous: Lifitegrast (LFA-1 antagonist)
