= Signaling peptide receptor =

Cell surface receptors

Signaling peptide receptor is a type of receptor which binds one or more signaling peptides or signaling proteins.

An example is the tropomyosin receptor kinase B (TrkB), which is bound and activated by the neurotrophic protein brain-derived neurotrophic factor (BDNF). Another example is the μ-opioid receptor (MOR), which is bound and activated by the opioid peptide hormone β-endorphin.

== Adiponectin receptor ==
=== AdipoR_{1} ===
- Agonists
  - Peptide
    - Adiponectin
    - ADP-355
    - ADP-399
  - Non-peptide
    - AdipoRon
    - (–)-Arctigenin
    - Arctiin
    - Gramine
    - Matairesinol
- Antagonists
  - Peptide
    - ADP-400

=== AdipoR_{2} ===
- Agonists
  - Peptide
    - Adiponectin
    - ADP-355
    - ADP-399
  - Non-peptide
    - AdipoRon
    - Deoxyschizandrin
    - Parthenolide
    - Syringing
    - Taxifoliol
- Antagonists
  - Peptide
    - ADP-400

== Bradykinin receptor ==
- Agonists
  - Bradykinin
  - Kallidin
- Antagonists
  - FR-173657
  - Icatibant
  - LF22-0542

== Calcitonin gene-related peptide receptor ==
- Agonists
  - Amylin
  - CGRP
  - Pramlintide
- Antagonists
  - Atogepant
  - BI 44370 TA
  - CGRP (8-37)
  - MK-3207
  - Olcegepant
  - Rimegepant
  - SB-268262
  - Telcagepant
  - Ubrogepant
- Antibodies
  - Eptinezumab
  - Erenumab
  - Fremanezumab
  - Galcanezumab

== Cholecystokinin receptor ==
=== CCK_{A} ===
- Agonists
  - Cholecystokinin
- Antagonists
  - Amiglumide
  - Asperlicin
  - Devazepide
  - Dexloxiglumide
  - Lintitript
  - Lorglumide
  - Loxiglumide
  - Pranazepide
  - Proglumide
  - Tarazepide
  - Tomoglumide

=== CCK_{B} ===
- Agonists
  - Cholecystokinin
  - CCK-4
  - Gastrin
  - Pentagastrin (CCK-5)
- Antagonists
  - Ceclazepide
  - CI-988 (PD-134308)
  - Itriglumide
  - L-365,360
  - Netazepide
  - Proglumide
  - Spiroglumide

=== Unsorted ===
- Antagonists
  - Nastorazepide

== Corticotropin-releasing hormone receptor ==
=== CRF_{1} ===
- Agonists
  - Cortagine
  - Corticorelin
  - Corticotropin-releasing hormone
  - Sauvagine
  - Stressin I
  - Urocortin
- Antagonists
  - Antalarmin
  - Astressin-B
  - CP-154,526
  - Emicerfont
  - Hypericin
  - LWH-234
  - NBI-27914
  - NBI-74788
  - Pexacerfont
  - R-121919
  - TS-041
  - Verucerfont

=== CRF_{2} ===
- Agonists
  - Corticorelin
  - Corticotropin-releasing hormone
  - Sauvagine
  - Urocortin
- Antagonists
  - Astressin-B

== Endothelin receptor ==
- Agonists
  - Endothelin 1
  - Endothelin 2
  - Endothelin 3
  - IRL-1620
  - Sarafotoxin
- Antagonists
  - A-192621
  - Ambrisentan
  - Aprocitentan
  - Atrasentan
  - Avosentan
  - Bosentan
  - BQ-123
  - BQ-788
  - Clazosentan
  - Darusentan
  - Edonentan
  - Enrasentan
  - Fandosentan
  - Feloprentan
  - Macitentan
  - Nebentan
  - Sitaxentan
  - Sparsentan
  - Tezosentan
  - Zibotentan

== Galanin receptor ==
=== GAL_{1} ===
- Agonists
  - Galanin
  - Galanin (1-15)
  - Galanin-like peptide
  - Galmic
  - Galnon
  - NAX 810-2
- Antagonists
  - C7
  - Dithiepine-1,1,4,4-tetroxide
  - Galantide (M15)
  - M32
  - M35
  - M40
  - SCH-202596

=== GAL_{2} ===
- Agonists
  - Galanin
  - Galanin (1-15)
  - Galanin (2-11)
  - Galanin-like peptide
  - Galmic
  - Galnon
  - J18
  - NAX 810-2
- Antagonists
  - C7
  - Galantide (M15)
  - M32
  - M35
  - M40
  - M871

=== GAL_{3} ===
- Agonists
  - Galanin
  - Galanin (1-15)
  - Galmic
  - Galnon
- Antagonists
  - C7
  - Galantide (M15)
  - GalR3ant
  - HT-2157
  - M32
  - M35
  - M40
  - SNAP-37889
  - SNAP-398299

== Glucagon-like peptide receptor ==
=== GLP-1 ===
- Agonists
  - Albiglutide
  - Beinaglutide
  - Dulaglutide
  - Efpeglenatide
  - Exenatide
  - GLP-1
  - Langlenatide
  - Liraglutide
  - Lixisenatide
  - Oxyntomodulin
  - Pegapamodutide
  - Semaglutide
  - Taspoglutide

=== GLP-2 ===
- Agonists
  - Apraglutide
  - Elsiglutide
  - Glepaglutide
  - GLP-2
  - Teduglutide

=== Others ===
- Propeptides
  - Preproglucagon
  - Proglucagon

== Glucagon receptor ==
- Agonists
  - Dasiglucagon
  - Glucagon
  - Oxyntomodulin
- Antagonists
  - Adomeglivant
  - L-168,049
  - LGD-6972
- Propeptides
  - Preproglucagon
  - Proglucagon

== Insulin receptor ==
- Agonists
  - Chaetochromin (4548-G05)
  - Insulin-like growth factor 1
  - Insulin-like growth factor 2
  - Insulin
  - Insulin aspart
  - Insulin degludec
  - Insulin detemir
  - Insulin glargine
  - Insulin glulisine
  - Insulin lispro
  - Mecasermin
  - Mecasermin rinfabate
- Antagonists
  - BMS-754807
  - S661
  - S961
- Kinase inhibitors
  - Linsitinib
- Antibodies
  - Xentuzumab (against IGF-1 and IGF-2)

== KiSS1-derived peptide receptor ==
- Agonists
  - Kisspeptin (kisspeptin-54, metastin)
  - Kisspeptin-10
  - KISS1-305
  - MVT-602 (RVT-602, TAK-448)
  - TAK-683
- Antagonists
  - Kisspeptin-234

== Leptin receptor ==
- Agonists
  - Leptin
  - Metreleptin

== Melanin-concentrating hormone receptor ==
=== MCH_{1} ===
- Agonists
  - Melanin-concentrating hormone
- Antagonists
  - ATC-0065
  - ATC-0175
  - GW-803430
  - NGD-4715
  - SNAP-7941
  - SNAP-94847

=== MCH_{2} ===
- Agonists
  - Melanin-concentrating hormone

== Neuropeptide FF receptor ==
- Agonists
  - Neuropeptide AF
  - Neuropeptide FF
  - Neuropeptide SF (RFRP-1)
  - Neuropeptide VF (RFRP-3)
- Antagonists
  - BIBP-3226
  - RF9

== Neuropeptide S receptor ==
- Agonists
  - Neuropeptide S
- Antagonists
  - ML-154
  - SHA-68

== Neuropeptide Y receptor ==
=== Y_{1} ===
- Agonists
  - Neuropeptide Y
  - Peptide YY
- Antagonists
  - BIBO-3304
  - BIBP-3226
  - BVD-10
  - GR-231118
  - PD-160170

=== Y_{2} ===
- Agonists
  - 2-Thiouridine 5'-triphosphate
  - Neuropeptide Y
  - Neuropeptide Y (13-36)
  - Peptide YY
  - Peptide YY (3-36)
- Antagonists
  - BIIE-0246
  - JNJ-5207787
  - SF-11

=== Y_{4} ===
- Agonists
  - GR-231118
  - Neuropeptide Y
  - Pancreatic polypeptide
  - Peptide YY
- Antagonists
  - UR-AK49

=== Y_{5} ===
- Agonists
  - BWX-46
  - Neuropeptide Y
  - Peptide YY
- Antagonists
  - CGP-71683
  - FMS-586
  - L-152,804
  - Lu AA-33810
  - MK-0557
  - NTNCB
  - Velneperit (S-2367)

== Neurotensin receptor ==
=== NTS_{1} ===
- Agonists
  - Neurotensin
  - Neuromedin N
- Antagonists
  - Meclinertant
  - SR-142948

=== NTS_{2} ===
- Agonists
  - Neurotensin
- Antagonists
  - Levocabastine
    - SR-142948

== Parathyroid hormone receptor ==
- Agonists
  - Abaloparatide
  - Parathyroid hormone
  - Parathyroid hormone-related protein (PTHrP)
  - Semparatide
  - Teriparatide

== Relaxin receptor ==
- Agonists
  - Insulin-like factor 3
  - Relaxin (1, 2, 3)
  - Serelaxin

== Thyrotropin-releasing hormone receptor ==
- Agonists
  - Azetirelin
  - JTP-2942
  - Montirelin
  - Orotirelin
  - Posatirelin
  - Protirelin
  - Rovatirelin
  - RX-77368 (thymoliberin)
  - Taltirelin
  - TRH (TRF)

== Thyrotropin receptor ==
- Agonists
  - Thyrotropin alfa
  - TSH (thyrotropin)

== Vasoactive intestinal peptide receptor and Pituitary adenylate cyclase-activating peptide ==
=== VIPR_{1} ===
- Agonists
  - Peptide
    - Bay 55-9837
    - LBT-3393
    - PACAP
    - VIP

=== VIPR_{2} ===
- Agonists
  - Peptide
    - LBT-3627
    - PACAP
    - VIP

=== PAC_{1} ===
- Agonists
  - PACAP
  - PACAP (1-27)
  - PACAP (1-38)
- Antagonists
  - PACAP (6-38)

=== Unsorted ===
- PHI
- PHM
- PHV

== Others ==
- Endogenous
  - Adrenomedullin
  - Apelin
  - Asprosin
  - Bombesin
  - Calcitonin
  - Carnosine
  - CART
  - CLIP
  - DSIP
  - Enteroglucagon
  - Formyl peptide
  - GALP
  - GIP
  - GRP
  - Integrin ligands
    - collagens
    - fibrinogen
    - fibronectin
    - laminins
    - ICAM-1
    - ICAM-2
    - osteopontin
    - VCAM-1
    - vitronectin
  - Kininogens
  - Motilin
  - Natriuretic peptides
    - ANP
    - BNP
    - CNP
    - urodilatin
  - Nesfatin-1
  - Neuromedin B
  - Neuromedin N
  - Neuromedin S
  - Neuromedin U
  - Obestatin
  - Osteocalcin
  - Resistin
  - Secretin
  - Thymopoietin
  - Thymosins
  - Thymulin
  - Urotensin-II
  - VGF
- Exogenous
  - Lifitegrast (LFA-1 antagonist)

== See also ==
- Neuropeptide receptor
- Neurotransmitter receptor
