= Kulke =

Kulke is a surname. Notable people with the surname include:

- Hermann Kulke (1938–2026), German historian and Indologist
- Matthew Kulke, American cancer researcher
- Max Kulke (born 2000), German footballer
