= C30H26O10 =

The molecular formula C_{30}H_{26}O_{10} (molar mass: 546.52 g/mol, exact mass: 546.1526 u) may refer to:

- Chaetochromin
- Vioxanthin
