= Matthew Kulke =

American cancer researcher

Matthew Helmut Kulke
- Education: Princeton University; UCSF School of Medicine; Harvard Medical School
- Occupations: Chief of Hematology/Oncology, co-director of the BU/BMC Cancer Center and Zoltan Kohn Professor at the Boston University School of Medicine.
- Years active: 1992-Present

Matthew Kulke is an American cancer researcher. He is the Chief of Hematology/Oncology, co-director of the BU/BMC Cancer Center and "Zoltan Kohn Professor" at the Boston University School of Medicine. His work has shed light on the molecular characteristics of neuroendocrine tumors and has led to the development of multiple new treatments for this condition. His research studies led to the development and approval of telotristat ethyl, a tryptophan hydroxylase inhibitor, for the treatment of patients with carcinoid syndrome. He has also contributed to early and late stage clinical trials of temozolomide, sunitinib, everolimus, and peptide receptor radiotherapy for neuroendocrine tumors.

== Education ==
Kulke received his undergraduate degree from Princeton University, his M.D. from the University of California, San Francisco School of Medicine, completed a residency in internal medicine at Brigham and Women's Hospital and a fellowship in Medical Oncology at Dana-Farber Cancer Institute. He holds a master's degree in medical science from Harvard Medical School.

== Career ==
After his education, Kulke subsequently joined the faculty at Dana-Farber Cancer Institute and Harvard Medical School where he rose to the rank of Professor of Medicine and was the founding director of the neuroendocrine tumor program. He has served in his current role at Boston University since 2018. His accomplishments in the field have been recognized at the national and international level. He has served as chair of the National Cancer Institute's Neuroendocrine Tumor Task Force from 2011-2014, as chair of the North American Neuroendocrine Tumor Society from 2014-2016, and as chair the National Comprehensive Cancer Network’s neuroendocrine tumor guidelines committee from 2010-2017.
