= Bradykinin receptor B1 =

Protein-coding gene in the species Homo sapiens

BDKRB1

Identifiers
- Aliases: BDKRB1, B1BKR, B1R, BDKRB2, BKB1R, BKR1, BRADYB1, Bradykinin receptor B1
- External IDs: OMIM: 600337; MGI: 88144; GeneCards: BDKRB1

Gene location (Human)
Chr.	Chromosome 14 (human)
Band	14q32.2	Start	96,256,210 bp
Band	14q32.2	End	96,268,967 bp

Gene location (Mouse)
Chr.	Chromosome 12 (mouse)
Band	12|12 E	Start	105,569,344 bp
Band	12|12 E	End	105,571,687 bp
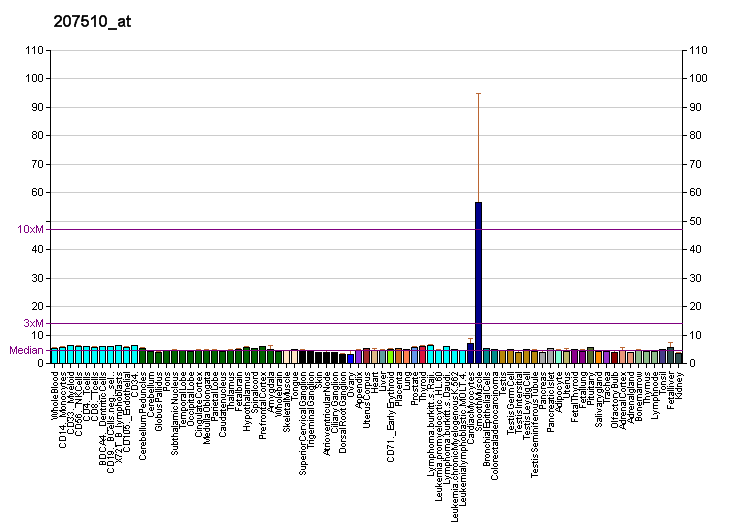
RNA expression pattern
Bgee	Human / Mouse (ortholog); Top expressed in: gonad; testicle; gallbladder; stromal cell of endometrium; mucosa of transverse colon; ectocervix; canal of the cervix; vagina; body of pancreas; appendix / Top expressed in: choroid plexus of fourth ventricle; entorhinal cortex; embryo; morula; zygote; secondary oocyte; morula; embryo; primary oocyte; lip; More reference expression data
BioGPS	More reference expression data
Gene ontology
Molecular function	G protein-coupled receptor activity; peptide binding; signal transducer activity; protein binding; bradykinin receptor activity
Cellular component	integral component of membrane; membrane; plasma membrane; integral component of plasma membrane; endoplasmic reticulum; neuron projection
Biological process	negative regulation of protein phosphorylation; negative regulation of blood pressure; positive regulation of leukocyte migration; positive regulation of cytosolic calcium ion concentration; response to stress; response to mechanical stimulus; positive regulation of release of sequestered calcium ion into cytosol; response to lipopolysaccharide; protein kinase C-activating G protein-coupled receptor signaling pathway; negative regulation of cell growth; sensory perception of pain; inflammatory response; cell migration; signal transduction; G protein-coupled receptor signaling pathway
Sources:Amigo / QuickGO
Orthologs
Databases	NCBI: entry; OMA: entry
Species	Human	Mouse
Entrez	623	12061
Ensembl	ENSG00000100739	ENSMUSG00000041347
UniProt	P46663	Q61125
RefSeq (mRNA)	NM_000710; NM_001386007	NM_007539
RefSeq (protein)	NP_000701	NP_031565
Location (UCSC)	Chr 14: 96.26 – 96.27 Mb	Chr 12: 105.57 – 105.57 Mb
PubMed search
- Wikidata
View/Edit Human	View/Edit Mouse

Bradykinin receptor B1 (B_{1}) is a G-protein coupled receptor encoded by the BDKRB1 gene in humans. Its principal ligand is bradykinin, a 9 amino acid peptide generated in pathophysiologic conditions such as inflammation, trauma, burns, shock, and allergy. The B_{1} receptor is one of two of G protein-coupled receptors that have been found which bind bradykinin and mediate responses to these pathophysiologic conditions.

B_{1} protein is synthesized de novo following tissue injury and receptor binding leads to an increase in the cytosolic calcium ion concentration, ultimately resulting in chronic and acute inflammatory responses.

Classical agonist of this receptor includes bradykinin1-8 (bradykinin with the first 8 amino acid) and antagonist includes [Leu8]-bradykinin1-8.

== Antagonists ==
- LF22-0542

== See also ==
- Bradykinin receptor
