= Neuropeptide Y receptor type 5 =

Protein-coding gene in the species Homo sapiens

NPY5R

Identifiers
- Aliases: NPY5R, NPY5-R, NPYR5, NPYY5-R, Neuropeptide Y receptor Y5
- External IDs: OMIM: 602001; MGI: 108082; GeneCards: NPY5R
Available structures
PDB	Ortholog search: PDBe RCSB
PDB	List of PDB id codes 2HE6

Gene location (Human)
Chr.	Chromosome 4 (human)
Band	4q32.2	Start	163,343,892 bp
Band	4q32.2	End	163,351,934 bp

Gene location (Mouse)
Chr.	Chromosome 8 (mouse)
Band	8 B3.1|8 33.15 cM	Start	67,132,617 bp
Band	8 B3.1|8 33.15 cM	End	67,140,780 bp
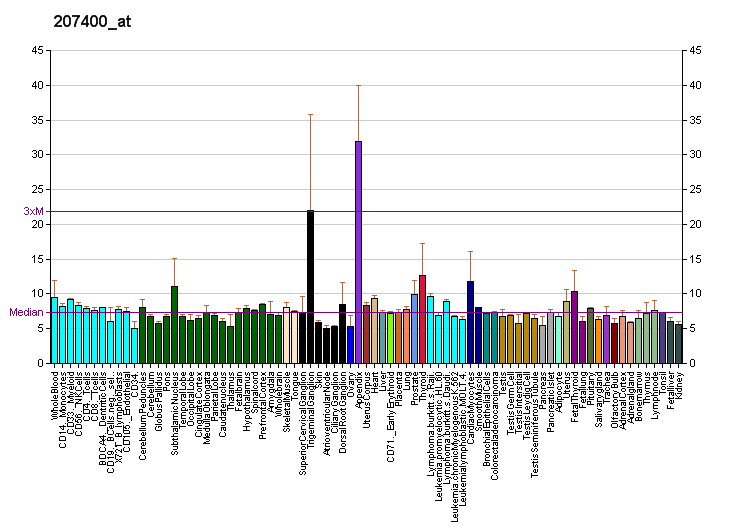
RNA expression pattern
Bgee	Human / Mouse (ortholog); Top expressed in: testicle; adipose tissue; tibial arteries; spleen; subcutaneous adipose tissue; Descending thoracic aorta; prefrontal cortex; right adrenal cortex; left adrenal cortex; abdominal fat / Top expressed in: lumbar subsegment of spinal cord; suprachiasmatic nucleus; substantia nigra; embryo; Region I of hippocampus proper; neuron; dentate gyrus of hippocampal formation granule cell; facial motor nucleus; nucleus accumbens; arcuate nucleus; More reference expression data
BioGPS	More reference expression data
Gene ontology
Molecular function	neuropeptide Y receptor activity; G protein-coupled receptor activity; signal transducer activity; peptide YY receptor activity; pancreatic polypeptide receptor activity
Cellular component	cytoplasm; integral component of membrane; membrane; plasma membrane; integral component of plasma membrane; neuron projection
Biological process	G protein-coupled receptor signaling pathway; negative regulation of glutamate secretion; eating behavior; outflow tract morphogenesis; negative regulation of apoptotic process; cardiac left ventricle morphogenesis; negative regulation of synaptic transmission, GABAergic; feeding behavior; positive regulation of acute inflammatory response; generation of ovulation cycle rhythm; neuropeptide signaling pathway; signal transduction; positive regulation of smooth muscle cell proliferation; positive regulation of cell population proliferation; ageing; chemical synaptic transmission; negative regulation of acute inflammatory response to antigenic stimulus; positive regulation of ERK1 and ERK2 cascade; blood circulation
Sources:Amigo / QuickGO
Orthologs
Databases	NCBI: entry; OMA: entry
Species	Human	Mouse
Entrez	4889	18168
Ensembl	ENSG00000164129	ENSMUSG00000044014
UniProt	Q15761	O70342
RefSeq (mRNA)	NM_006174; NM_001317091; NM_001317092	NM_016708; NM_001358957; NM_001358958
RefSeq (protein)	NP_001304020; NP_001304021; NP_006165	NP_057917; NP_001345886; NP_001345887
Location (UCSC)	Chr 4: 163.34 – 163.35 Mb	Chr 8: 67.13 – 67.14 Mb
PubMed search
- Wikidata
View/Edit Human	View/Edit Mouse

Neuropeptide Y receptor type 5 is a protein that in humans is encoded by the NPY5R gene.

== Selective ligands ==
=== Agonists ===
- Neuropeptide Y (endogenous agonist, non subtype selective)
- BWX-46 (selective NPY_{5} agonist, CAS# 172997-92-1)
- Peptide YY

=== Antagonists ===
- CGP-71683 (CAS# 192322-50-2)
- FMS-586
- L-152,804 (CAS# 6508-43-6)
- Lu AA-33810
- MK-0557
- NTNCB (CAS# 486453-65-0)
- Velneperit (S-2367)

== See also ==
- Neuropeptide Y receptor
