= ACT-462206 =

Chemical compound

Clinical data
- Routes of administration: Oral
- Drug class: Orexin receptor antagonist

Legal status
- Legal status: Investigational

Identifiers
- IUPAC name: (2S)-N-(3,5-Dimethylphenyl)-1-[(4-methoxyphenyl)sulfonyl]-2-pyrrolidinecarboxamide
- CAS Number: 1361321-96-1
- PubChem CID: 40924317
- IUPHAR/BPS: 9303
- ChemSpider: 34500438
- UNII: 64ONO62P28
- ChEMBL: ChEMBL3597952

Chemical and physical data
- Formula: C_{20}H_{24}N_{2}O_{4}S
- Molar mass: 388.48 g·mol^{−1}
- 3D model (JSmol): Interactive image
- SMILES: O=C(NC=1C=C(C=C(C1)C)C)C2N(CCC2)S(=O)(=O)C3=CC=C(OC)C=C3
- InChI: InChI=InChI=1S/C20H24N2O4S/c1-14-11-15(2)13-16(12-14)21-20(23)19-5-4-10-22(19)27(24,25)18-8-6-17(26-3)7-9-18/h6-9,11-13,19H,4-5,10H2,1-3H3,(H,21,23)/t19-/m0/s1; Key:NHPQGZOBHSVTAQ-IBGZPJMESA-N

ACT-462206 is a dual orexin receptor antagonist (IC_{50} for OX_{1} = 60nM, OX_{2} = 11nM) which has been investigated for the treatment of insomnia. In human trials, ACT-462206 produced dose-dependent sedative effects and was generally well tolerated, with residual sleepiness and headache being the most common adverse events.

== Pharmacology ==
In humans, the sedative effects of ACT-462206 began 45 minutes after oral administration, and dissipated within 8 hours - consistent with a favorable pharmacodynamic profile for the treatment of insomnia. However, the pharmacokinetic profile of ACT-462206 diverges significantly from what would be expected based on behavioral effects. Elevated plasma concentrations of ACT-462206 are sustained for over 24–36 hours after administration - despite behavioral measures of sedation disappearing within 8 hours of administration.
