= ACT-335827 =

Chemical compound

Clinical data
- Routes of administration: Oral
- Drug class: Orexin 1 receptor antagonist

Identifiers
- IUPAC name: (R)-2-((S)-1-(3,4-dimethoxybenzyl)-6,7-dimethoxy-3,4-dihydroisoquinolin-2(1H)-yl)-N-isopropyl-2-phenylacetamide
- CAS Number: 1354039-86-3
- PubChem CID: 54765113
- ChemSpider: 30774267
- ChEMBL: ChEMBL2413367
- CompTox Dashboard (EPA): DTXSID901336764

Chemical and physical data
- Formula: C_{31}H_{38}N_{2}O_{5}
- Molar mass: 518.654 g·mol^{−1}
- 3D model (JSmol): Interactive image
- SMILES: COC1=CC(C[C@@H](C2=C3)N(CCC2=CC(OC)=C3OC)[C@@H](C(NC(C)C)=O)C4=CC=CC=C4)=CC=C1OC
- InChI: InChI=1S/C31H38N2O5/c1-20(2)32-31(34)30(22-10-8-7-9-11-22)33-15-14-23-18-28(37-5)29(38-6)19-24(23)25(33)16-21-12-13-26(35-3)27(17-21)36-4/h7-13,17-20,25,30H,14-16H2,1-6H3,(H,32,34)/t25-,30+/m0/s1; Key:HXHOBPVRRPCTLG-SETSBSEESA-N

ACT-335827 is an orally available, selective orexin 1 receptor antagonist with anxiolytic effects in animals. Unlike other orexin receptor antagonists, ACT-335827 lacks sedative effects and was found to have no impact on sleep architecture in mice.
