= Glucagon-like peptide receptor =

The glucagon-like peptide receptors (GLPRs) include the following two receptors:

- Glucagon-like peptide-1 receptor (GLP-1R) – binds Glucagon-like peptide-1 (GLP-1)
- Glucagon-like peptide-2 receptor (GLP-2R) – binds Glucagon-like peptide-2 (GLP-2)

== See also ==
- Glucagon receptor
