= Bradykinin receptor =

Group of G-protein coupled receptors

bradykinin receptor B1

Identifiers
- Symbol: BDKRB1
- NCBI gene: 623
- HGNC: 1029
- OMIM: 600337
- RefSeq: NM_000710
- UniProt: P46663

Other data
- Locus: Chr. 14 q32.1-32.2
Search for
- Structures: Swiss-model
- Domains: InterPro

bradykinin receptor B2

Identifiers
- Symbol: BDKRB2
- NCBI gene: 624
- HGNC: 1030
- OMIM: 113503
- RefSeq: NM_000623
- UniProt: P30411

Other data
- Locus: Chr. 14 q32.1-32.2
Search for
- Structures: Swiss-model
- Domains: InterPro

The bradykinin receptor family is a group of G-protein coupled receptors whose principal ligand is the protein bradykinin.

There are two Bradykinin receptors: the B_{1} receptor and the B_{2} receptor.

== B_{1} receptor ==
Bradykinin receptor B1 (B_{1}) is a G-protein coupled receptor encoded by the BDKRB1 gene in humans. Its principal ligand is bradykinin, a 9 amino acid peptide generated in pathophysiologic conditions such as inflammation, trauma, burns, shock, and allergy. The B_{1} receptor is one of two G protein-coupled receptors that have been found which bind bradykinin and mediate responses to these pathophysiologic conditions.

B1 protein is synthesized by de novo following tissue injury and receptor binding leads to an increase in the cytosolic calcium ion concentration, ultimately resulting in chronic and acute inflammatory responses.

== B_{2} receptor ==
The B_{2} receptor is a G protein-coupled receptor, coupled to G_{q} and G_{i}. G_{q} stimulates phospholipase C to increase intracellular free calcium and G_{i} inhibits adenylate cyclase. Furthermore, the receptor stimulates the mitogen-activated protein kinase pathways. It is ubiquitously and constitutively expressed in healthy tissues.

The B_{2} receptor forms a complex with angiotensin converting enzyme (ACE), and this is thought to play a role in cross-talk between the renin-angiotensin system (RAS) and the kinin–kallikrein system (KKS). The heptapeptide angiotensin (1-7) also potentiates bradykinin action on B_{2} receptors.

Icatibant is a second generation B_{2} receptor antagonist which has undergone limited clinical trials in pain and inflammation. FR 173657 is another orally active non-peptide B2 antagonist that has undergone limited trials as analgesic and antiinflammatory drug.

Kallidin also signals through the B_{2} receptor.
