= Enteroglucagon =

Peptide hormone

Enteroglucagon is a peptide hormone derived from preproglucagon. It is a gastrointestinal hormone, secreted from mucosal cells primarily of the colon and terminal ileum. It consists of 37 amino acids. Enteroglucagon is released when fats and glucose are present in the small intestine; which decrease the motility to allow sufficient time for these nutrients to be absorbed.

== Discovery ==
In 1948, Sutherland and De Duve identified a gastrointestinal glucagon-like material in gastric mucosa, the term "enteroglucagon" was used to describe this material that shared a similar immunoreactivity with glucagon. A half-century later, Brubaker and Drucker studied proglucagon gene expression, they discovered the function of enteroglucagon is related to the growth of intestinal epithelium.

== Function ==
Enteroglucagon is a proglucagon-derived peptide or enteroendocrine cells derived peptide in the small intestine. Preproglucagon undergoes post translational modification to release glucagon-like peptides (GLP-1 and GLP-2) and other molecules derived from L-cells of intestine. GLP-1 is derived from a class of intestinal hormones called incretin and the molecule exists in two forms GLP-1(7-37) and GLP-1(7-36) amide. GLP-1 form of incretin starts circulating in response to a high blood glucose level. Incretin effect is a negative feedback loop between glucose and insulin level, it promotes insulin release from beta cells of pancreas islet and suppresses glucagon when the glucose level is high. In vertebrate mammals, GLP-2 sequences are highly conversed in the intestine. The molecule functions as a part of adaptive response, such that contributes intestinal growth, proliferation effect, intestinal dilation (increases the mucosal blood flow) and reduces the chance of apoptosis.

== Clinical significance ==
GLP-1 is effective at reducing blood glucose levels. GLP-1 analogs have a significant therapeutic effect and high efficacy on diabetes treatments and hypoglycemia prevention. Proliferation effect and trophic effect on the small intestine, GLP-2 is used as a therapy to support patients with short-bowel syndrome and other underlying intestinal conditions.

== See also ==
- Proglucagon
