= Darusentan =

Chemical compound

Clinical data
- Routes of administration: Oral
- ATC code: none

Legal status
- Legal status: Investigational

Pharmacokinetic data
- Metabolism: Hepatic
- Elimination half-life: 12.5 hours

Identifiers
- IUPAC name: (2S)-2-(4,6-Dimethoxypyrimidin-2-yl)oxy-3-methoxy-3,3-di(phenyl)propanoic acid
- CAS Number: 171714-84-4
- PubChem CID: 177236
- IUPHAR/BPS: 3508
- ChemSpider: 154336
- UNII: 33JD57L6RW
- ChEMBL: ChEMBL23261
- CompTox Dashboard (EPA): DTXSID1057664
- ECHA InfoCard: 100.126.841

Chemical and physical data
- Formula: C_{22}H_{22}N_{2}O_{6}
- Molar mass: 410.426 g·mol^{−1}
- 3D model (JSmol): Interactive image
- SMILES: COC1=CC(=NC(=N1)O[C@H](C(=O)O)C(C2=CC=CC=C2)(C3=CC=CC=C3)OC)OC
- InChI: InChI=1S/C22H22N2O6/c1-27-17-14-18(28-2)24-21(23-17)30-19(20(25)26)22(29-3,15-10-6-4-7-11-15)16-12-8-5-9-13-16/h4-14,19H,1-3H3,(H,25,26)/t19-/m1/s1; Key:FEJVSJIALLTFRP-LJQANCHMSA-N

Darusentan (LU-135252; HMR-4005) is an endothelin receptor antagonist. Gilead Colorado, a subsidiary of Gilead Sciences, under license from Abbott Laboratories, is developing darusentan for the potential treatment of uncontrolled hypertension.

In June 2003, Myogen licensed the compound from Abbott for its application in the cancer field.

In May 2007, a randomized, double-blind, active control, parallel assignment, safety and efficacy phase III trial was initiated in subjects who had completed the maintenance period of the DAR-312 study, but was terminated because the study did not reach its primary endpoints.

== See also ==
- Ambrisentan
