= Taspoglutide =

Chemical compound

Clinical data
- Routes of administration: subcutaneous
- ATC code: none

Pharmacokinetic data
- Bioavailability: N/A

Identifiers
- CAS Number: 275371-94-3
- PubChem CID: 56842233
- ChemSpider: 32819947
- UNII: 2PHK27IP3B
- KEGG: D09723

Chemical and physical data
- Formula: C_{152}H_{232}N_{40}O_{45}
- Molar mass: 3339.763 g·mol^{−1}
- SMILES: CC[C@H](C)[C@H](NC(=O)[C@H](Cc1ccccc1)NC(=O)[C@H](CCC(=O)O)NC(=O)[C@H](CCCCN)NC(=O)[C@H](C)NC(=O)[C@H](C)NC(=O)[C@H](CCC(N)=O)NC(=O)CNC(=O)[C@H](CCC(=O)O)NC(=O)[C@H](CC(C)C)NC(=O)[C@H](Cc1ccc(O)cc1)NC(=O)[C@H](CO)NC(=O)[C@H](CO)NC(=O)[C@@H](NC(=O)[C@H](CC(=O)O)NC(=O)[C@H](CO)NC(=O)[C@@H](NC(=O)[C@H](Cc1ccccc1)NC(=O)[C@@H](NC(=O)CNC(=O)[C@H](CCC(=O)O)NC(=O)C(C)(C)NC(=O)[C@@H](N)Cc1c[nH]cn1)[C@@H](C)O)[C@@H](C)O)C(C)C)C(=O)N[C@@H](C)C(=O)N[C@@H](Cc1c[nH]c2ccccc12)C(=O)N[C@@H](CC(C)C)C(=O)N[C@H](C(=O)N[C@@H](CCCCN)C(=O)NC(C)(C)C(=O)N[C@@H](CCCNC(=N)N)C(N)=O)C(C)C
- InChI: InChI=1S/C152H232N40O45/c1-20-78(10)119(145(233)168-81(13)125(213)174-105(63-87-66-162-92-39-28-27-38-90(87)92)134(222)176-101(59-75(4)5)135(223)187-117(76(6)7)143(231)173-95(41-30-32-56-154)142(230)192-152(18,19)148(236)184-93(122(157)210)42-33-57-161-150(158)159)189-136(224)103(60-84-34-23-21-24-35-84)177-131(219)99(50-54-115(206)207)172-130(218)94(40-29-31-55-153)170-124(212)80(12)166-123(211)79(11)167-129(217)98(47-51-110(156)199)169-111(200)68-163-127(215)96(48-52-113(202)203)171-132(220)100(58-74(2)3)175-133(221)102(62-86-43-45-89(198)46-44-86)178-139(227)107(70-193)181-141(229)109(72-195)182-144(232)118(77(8)9)188-138(226)106(65-116(208)209)179-140(228)108(71-194)183-147(235)121(83(15)197)190-137(225)104(61-85-36-25-22-26-37-85)180-146(234)120(82(14)196)186-112(201)69-164-128(216)97(49-53-114(204)205)185-149(237)151(16,17)191-126(214)91(155)64-88-67-160-73-165-88/h21-28,34-39,43-46,66-67,73-83,91,93-109,117-121,162,193-198H,20,29-33,40-42,47-65,68-72,153-155H2,1-19H3,(H2,156,199)(H2,157,210)(H,160,165)(H,163,215)(H,164,216)(H,166,211)(H,167,217)(H,168,233)(H,169,200)(H,170,212)(H,171,220)(H,172,218)(H,173,231)(H,174,213)(H,175,221)(H,176,222)(H,177,219)(H,178,227)(H,179,228)(H,180,234)(H,181,229)(H,182,232)(H,183,235)(H,184,236)(H,185,237)(H,186,201)(H,187,223)(H,188,226)(H,189,224)(H,190,225)(H,191,214)(H,192,230)(H,202,203)(H,204,205)(H,206,207)(H,208,209)(H4,158,159,161)/t78-,79-,80-,81-,82+,83+,91-,93-,94-,95-,96-,97-,98-,99-,100-,101-,102-,103-,104-,105-,106-,107-,108-,109-,117-,118-,119-,120-,121-/m0/s1; Key:WRGVLTAWMNZWGT-VQSPYGJZSA-N

Taspoglutide is a former experimental drug, a glucagon-like peptide-1 agonist (GLP-1 agonist), that was under investigation for treatment of type 2 diabetes and being codeveloped by Ipsen and Roche.

Initially, phase II trials reported it was effective and well tolerated.

Of the eight planned phase III clinical trials of weekly taspoglutide (four against exenatide, sitagliptin, insulin glargine, and pioglitazone), at least five were active in 2009. Preliminary results in early 2010 were favourable. (At least one of the eight planned phase III trials had not started recruiting by end 2009.)

In September 2010 Roche halted Phase III clinical trials due to instances of serious hypersensitivity reactions and gastrointestinal side effects.

As of May 2022 no new trials have been registered since 2010.

== Chemistry ==
Taspoglutide is the peptide with the sequence His-Aib-Glu-Gly-Thr-Phe-Thr-Ser-Asp-Val-Ser-Ser-Tyr-Leu-Glu-Gly-Gln-Ala-Ala-Lys-Glu-Phe-Ile-Ala-Trp-Leu-Val-Lys-Aib-Arg-NH_{2}, where Aib is 2-aminoisobutyric acid (2-methylalanine).

In other words, it is the 8-(2-methylalanine)-35-(2-methylalanine)-36-L-argininamide derivative of the amino acid sequence 7–36 of human glucagon-like peptide I.

== See also ==
- Incretin
