= Taltirelin =

Chemical compound

Clinical data
- Other names: (4S)-N-[(2S)-1-[(2S)-2-carbamoylpyrrolidin-1-yl]-3-(3H-imidazol-4-yl)-1-oxopropan-2-yl]-1-methyl-2,6-dioxo-1,3-diazinane-4-carboxamide
- AHFS/Drugs.com: International Drug Names
- Routes of administration: Oral
- ATC code: none

Identifiers
- IUPAC name: N-{[(4S)-1-methyl-2,6-dioxohexahydropyrimidin-4-yl]carbonyl}-L-histidyl-L-prolinamide
- CAS Number: 103300-74-9 201677-75-0
- PubChem CID: 656609
- IUPHAR/BPS: 2143
- ChemSpider: 102734
- UNII: DOZ62MV6A5
- ChEBI: CHEBI:135653
- CompTox Dashboard (EPA): DTXSID0043763

Chemical and physical data
- Formula: C_{17}H_{31}N_{7}O_{9}
- Molar mass: 477.475 g·mol^{−1}
- 3D model (JSmol): Interactive image
- SMILES: CN1C(=O)C[C@H](NC1=O)C(=O)N[C@@H](CC2=CN=CN2)C(=O)N3CCC[C@H]3C(=O)N
- InChI: InChI=1S/C17H23N7O5/c1-23-13(25)6-10(22-17(23)29)15(27)21-11(5-9-7-19-8-20-9)16(28)24-4-2-3-12(24)14(18)26/h7-8,10-12H,2-6H2,1H3,(H2,18,26)(H,19,20)(H,21,27)(H,22,29)/t10-,11-,12-/m0/s1; Key:LQZAIAZUDWIVPM-SRVKXCTJSA-N

Taltirelin (marketed under the tradename Ceredist) is a thyrotropin-releasing hormone (TRH) analog, which mimics the physiological actions of TRH, but with a much longer half-life and duration of effects, and little development of tolerance following prolonged dosing. It has nootropic, neuroprotective and analgesic effects.

Taltirelin is primarily being researched for the treatment of spinocerebellar ataxia; limited research has also been carried out with regard to other neurodegenerative disorders, e.g., spinal muscular atrophy.
