= BIBP-3226 =

Chemical compound

Clinical data
- Other names: BIBP-3226

Identifiers
- IUPAC name: (2R)-5-(diaminomethylideneamino)-2-([2,2-diphenylacetyl]amino)-N-[(4-hydroxyphenyl)methyl]pentanamide
- CAS Number: 159013-54-4
- PubChem CID: 5311023
- IUPHAR/BPS: 1485
- ChemSpider: 4470561
- UNII: RG9766UGZ8
- ChEMBL: ChEMBL332347
- CompTox Dashboard (EPA): DTXSID30415502

Chemical and physical data
- Formula: C_{27}H_{31}N_{5}O_{3}
- Molar mass: 473.577 g·mol^{−1}
- 3D model (JSmol): Interactive image
- SMILES: C1=CC=C(C=C1)C(C2=CC=CC=C2)C(=O)N[C@H](CCCN=C(N)N)C(=O)NCC3=CC=C(C=C3)O
- InChI: InChI=1S/C27H31N5O3/c28-27(29)30-17-7-12-23(25(34)31-18-19-13-15-22(33)16-14-19)32-26(35)24(20-8-3-1-4-9-20)21-10-5-2-6-11-21/h1-6,8-11,13-16,23-24,33H,7,12,17-18H2,(H,31,34)(H,32,35)(H4,28,29,30)/t23-/m1/s1; Key:KUWBXRGRMQZCSS-HSZRJFAPSA-N

BIBP-3226 is a drug used in scientific research which acts as a potent and selective antagonist for both the Neuropeptide Y receptor Y_{1} and also the neuropeptide FF receptor. It was the first non-peptide antagonist developed for the Y_{1} receptor and has been widely used to help determine its functions in the body. Activation of Y_{1} is thought to be involved in functions such as regulation of appetite and anxiety, and BIBP-3226 has anxiogenic and anorectic effects, as well as blocking the Y_{1}-mediated corticotropin releasing hormone release. It has also been used as a lead compound to develop a number of newer more potent Y_{1} antagonists.
