= Astressin-B =

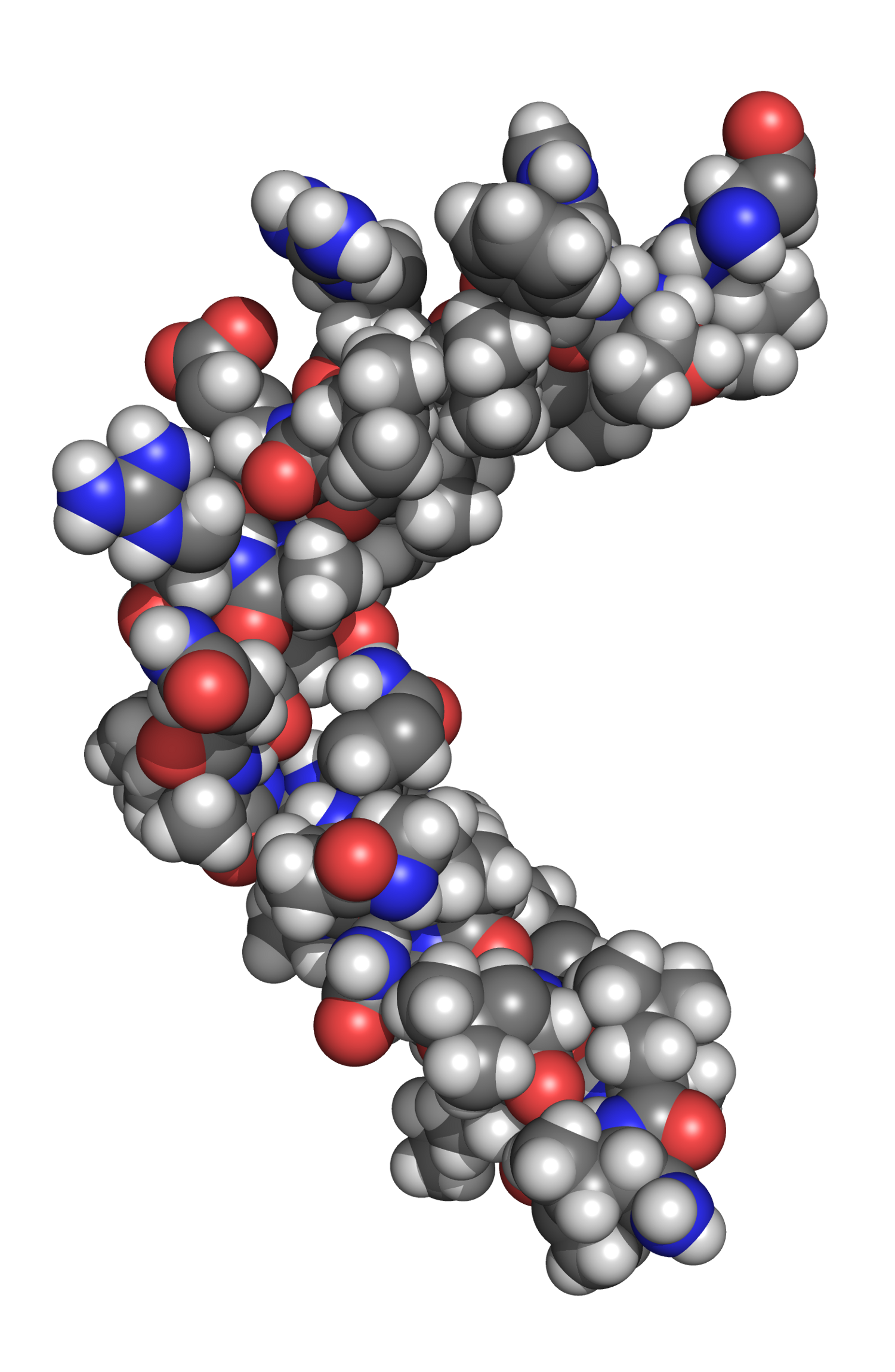
- Space-filling model of astressin-B. PDB: 2rmb.

Identifiers
- IUPAC name: Cyclo(30-33)(phenylalanyl(12)-norleucyl(21)-Cα-methylleucyl(2-7)-glutamyl(30)-lysyl(33)-norleucyl(38)-Cα-methyleucyl(40))acetyl-hCRF(9-41)
- PubChem CID: 73350132
- ChemSpider: 59008829
- ChEMBL: ChEMBL2370918

Chemical and physical data
- Formula: C_{183}H_{305}N_{47}O_{55}
- Molar mass: 4043.727 g·mol^{−1}
- 3D model (JSmol): Interactive image
- SMILES: CCCC[C@H](NC(=O)[C@H](CCCCN)NC(=O)[C@H](CCCN=C(N)N)NC(=O)[C@H](CC(C)C)NC(=O)[C@@](C)(CC(C)C)NC(=O)[C@H](Cc1c[nH]cn1)NC(=O)[C@@H](Cc2ccccc2)NC(=O)[C@H](CO)NC(=O)[C@H](CC(C)C)NC(=O)[C@H](CC(=O)O)NC(=O)C)C(=O)N[C@@H]([C@@H](C)CC)C(=O)N[C@@H](CCC(=O)O)C(=O)N[C@@H]([C@@H](C)CC)C(=O)N[C@@H](CCC(=O)O)C(=O)N[C@@H](CCCCN)C(=O)N[C@@H](CCC(=O)N)C(=O)N[C@@H](CCC(=O)O)C(=O)N[C@@H](CCCCN)C(=O)N[C@@H](CCC(=O)O)C(=O)N[C@@H](CCCCN)C(=O)N[C@@H](CCC(=O)O)C(=O)N[C@@H](CCC(=O)O)C(=O)N[C@@H](C)C(=O)NC3CCC(=O)NCCCC[C@H](NC(=O)[C@H](CC(=O)N)NC(=O)[C@@H](CC(=O)N)NC3=O)C(=O)N[C@@H](CC(C)C)C(=O)N[C@@H](CC(C)C)C(=O)N[C@@H](CC(C)C)C(=O)N[C@@H](CC(=O)O)C(=O)N[C@](C)(CC(C)C)C(=O)N[C@@H]([C@@H](C)CC)C(=O)N
- InChI: InChI=1S/C183H305N47O55/c1-26-30-47-106(201-151(256)107(48-34-39-70-184)202-155(260)112(53-44-75-196-181(192)193)207-169(274)125(80-96(13)14)225-179(284)182(24,87-97(15)16)229-175(280)127(82-105-89-194-91-197-105)220-170(275)126(81-104-45-32-31-33-46-104)219-174(279)132(90-231)224-168(273)124(79-95(11)12)218-173(278)130(85-143(249)250)199-103(23)232)163(268)226-146(100(20)28-3)178(283)214-120(61-69-142(247)248)164(269)227-147(101(21)29-4)177(282)213-119(60-68-141(245)246)161(266)205-108(49-35-40-71-185)152(257)208-113(54-62-133(188)233)157(262)212-117(58-66-139(241)242)159(264)204-109(50-36-41-72-186)153(258)210-116(57-65-138(239)240)158(263)203-110(51-37-42-73-187)154(259)211-118(59-67-140(243)244)160(265)209-115(56-64-137(237)238)150(255)198-102(22)149(254)200-114-55-63-136(236)195-74-43-38-52-111(206-171(276)128(83-134(189)234)222-172(277)129(84-135(190)235)221-162(114)267)156(261)215-121(76-92(5)6)165(270)216-122(77-93(7)8)166(271)217-123(78-94(9)10)167(272)223-131(86-144(251)252)176(281)230-183(25,88-98(17)18)180(285)228-145(148(191)253)99(19)27-2/h31-33,45-46,89,91-102,106-132,145-147,231H,26-30,34-44,47-88,90,184-187H2,1-25H3,(H2,188,233)(H2,189,234)(H2,190,235)(H2,191,253)(H,194,197)(H,195,236)(H,198,255)(H,199,232)(H,200,254)(H,201,256)(H,202,260)(H,203,263)(H,204,264)(H,205,266)(H,206,276)(H,207,274)(H,208,257)(H,209,265)(H,210,258)(H,211,259)(H,212,262)(H,213,282)(H,214,283)(H,215,261)(H,216,270)(H,217,271)(H,218,278)(H,219,279)(H,220,275)(H,221,267)(H,222,277)(H,223,272)(H,224,273)(H,225,284)(H,226,268)(H,227,269)(H,228,285)(H,229,280)(H,230,281)(H,237,238)(H,239,240)(H,241,242)(H,243,244)(H,245,246)(H,247,248)(H,249,250)(H,251,252)(H4,192,193,196)/t99-,100-,101-,102-,106-,107-,108-,109-,110-,111-,112-,113-,114?,115-,116-,117-,118-,119-,120-,121-,122-,123-,124-,125-,126+,127-,128-,129+,130-,131-,132-,145-,146-,147-,182+,183+/m0/s1; Key:BGFHNAZIBICPLD-IXILWOCFSA-N

Astressin-B is a nonselective corticotropin releasing hormone antagonist that reduces the synthesis of adrenocorticotropic hormone and cortisol.

It reduces the synthesis of adrenocorticotropic hormone and improves the sexual drive of rats under stressing conditions.

Astressin-B is able to delay the emptying of solid food in mice. Astressin-B can prevent the release of adrenocorticotropic hormone in mice due to shock, alcohol and endotoxemia.

Treatment with astressin-B caused the sudden growth of hair in mice bred for a propensity for stress.
