= ATC-0175 =

Chemical compound

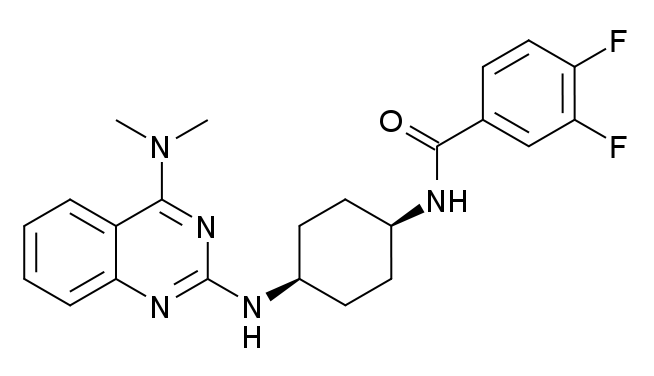

Identifiers
- IUPAC name: N-[cis-4-([4-(dimethylamino)quinazolin-2-yl]amino)cyclohexyl]-3,4-difluorobenzamide
- CAS Number: 509118-03-0
- PubChem CID: 9934033
- IUPHAR/BPS: 1305
- ChemSpider: 8109661
- UNII: 539503G9M0

Chemical and physical data
- Formula: C_{23}H_{25}F_{2}N_{5}O
- Molar mass: 425.484 g·mol^{−1}
- 3D model (JSmol): Interactive image
- SMILES: Fc1ccc(cc1F)C(=O)NC3CCC(CC3)Nc(nc4N(C)C)nc2ccccc24
- InChI: InChI=1S/C23H25F2N5O/c1-30(2)21-17-5-3-4-6-20(17)28-23(29-21)27-16-10-8-15(9-11-16)26-22(31)14-7-12-18(24)19(25)13-14/h3-7,12-13,15-16H,8-11H2,1-2H3,(H,26,31)(H,27,28,29); Key:FAIMGWSOSCFGRU-UHFFFAOYSA-N

ATC-0175 is a drug used in scientific research, which is a selective, non-peptide antagonist at the melanin concentrating hormone receptor MCH_{1}. In animal studies it has been shown to produce both anxiolytic and antidepressant actions, but without sedative or ataxic side effects.
