= Thymulin =

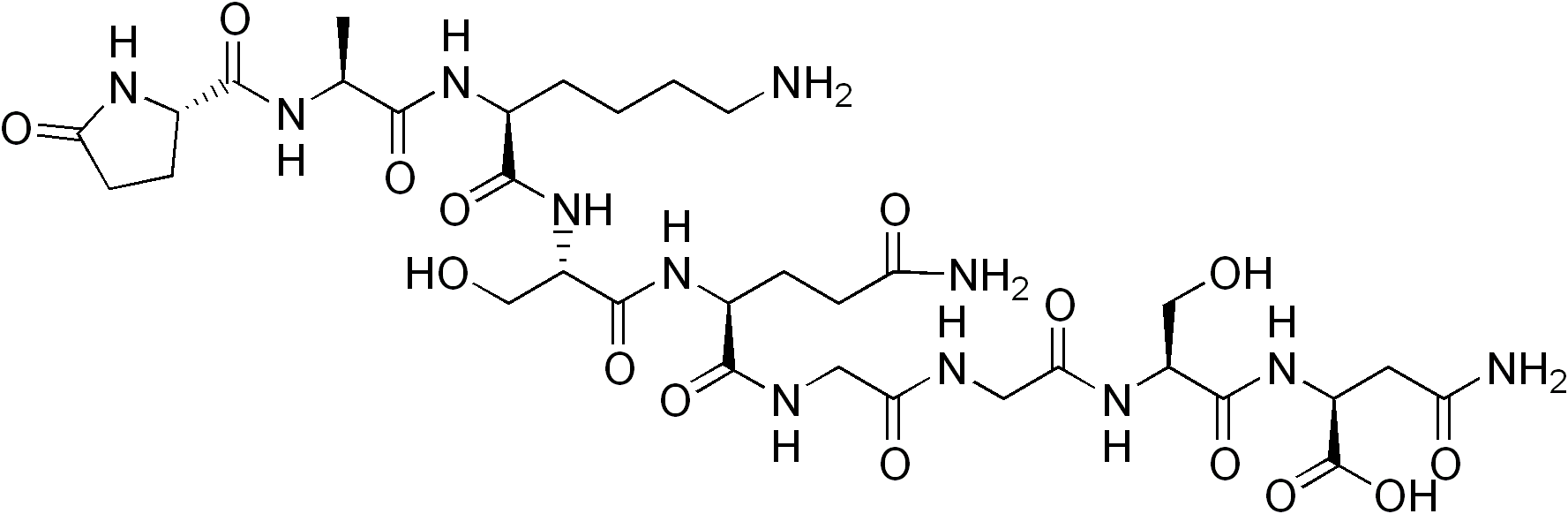

Names
- IUPAC name L-Pyroglutamyl-L-alanyl-L-lysyl-L-seryl-L-glutaminyl-glycyl-glycyl-L-seryl-L-asparagine

Identifiers
CAS Number	63958-90-7
3D model (JSmol)	Interactive image
ChemSpider	2342226
PubChem CID	3085284
UNII	9H198D04WL
CompTox Dashboard (EPA)	DTXSID10213801
- InChI: InChI=1S/C33H54N12O15/c1-15(39-29(55)18-6-8-24(50)40-18)27(53)42-16(4-2-3-9-34)30(56)45-21(14-47)32(58)43-17(5-7-22(35)48)28(54)38-11-25(51)37-12-26(52)41-20(13-46)31(57)44-19(33(59)60)10-23(36)49/h15-21,46-47H,2-14,34H2,1H3,(H2,35,48)(H2,36,49)(H,37,51)(H,38,54)(H,39,55)(H,40,50)(H,41,52)(H,42,53)(H,43,58)(H,44,57)(H,45,56)(H,59,60)/t15-,16-,17-,18-,19-,20-,21-/m0/s1 Key: LIFNDDBLJFPEAN-BPSSIEEOSA-N
- SMILES: C[C@@H](C(=O)N[C@@H](CCCCN)C(=O)N[C@@H](CO)C(=O)N[C@@H](CCC(=O)N)C(=O)NCC(=O)NCC(=O)N[C@@H](CO)C(=O)N[C@@H](CC(=O)N)C(=O)O)NC(=O)[C@@H]1CCC(=O)N1

Properties
Chemical formula	C_{33}H_{54}N_{12}O_{15}
Molar mass	858.864 g·mol^{−1}
- Except where otherwise noted, data are given for materials in their standard state (at 25 °C [77 °F], 100 kPa). verify (what is ?) Infobox references

Thymulin (also known as thymic factor or its old name facteur thymique serique) is a nonapeptide produced by two distinct epithelial populations in the thymus first described by Bach in 1977. It requires zinc for biological activity. Its peptide sequence is H-Pyr-Ala-Lys-Ser-Gln-Gly-Gly-Ser-Asn-OH.

The hormone is believed to be involved in T-cell differentiation and enhancement of T and NK cell actions. Besides this rather paracrine or auto-organic effects on the thymus dependent immune system, thymulin seems to have neuroendocrine effects as well. There exist bidirectional interactions between thymic epithelium and the hypothalamus-pituitary axis (for example, thymulin follows a circadian rhythm and physiologically elevated ACTH levels correlate positively with thymulin plasma levels and vice versa).

A recent focus has been on the role of thymulin as an effector on proinflammatory mediators/cytokines. A peptide analog of thymulin (PAT) has been found to have analgesic effects in higher concentrations and particularly neuroprotective anti-inflammatory effects in the CNS. Astrocytes seem to be the target for thymulin for this effect. Researchers hope to develop drugs thwarting inflammatory processes associated with neurodegenerative diseases and even rheumatism with the help of thymulin analogs.

Significantly decreased thymulin levels have been associated with anorexia nervosa.

Pro-inflammatory myeloid cells along with production of the pro-inflammatory cytokines interleukin-1α (IL-1α), interleukin-1β (IL-1β), interleukin-6 (IL-6), and tumor necrosis factor α (TNF-α) have been found to increase with age in rodents and humans. This is part of "inflammaging". Activation of these myeloid cells and consequent elevation in cytokine levels have been found to be suppressed by thymulin via inhibition of NF-κB signaling. Thymulin levels decrease with age.

== See also ==
- IL-2 receptor
- Thymosin
