= GW-803430 =

Chemical compound

Clinical data
- ATC code: none

Identifiers
- IUPAC name: 6-(4-chlorophenyl)-3-[3-methoxy-4-(2-pyrrolidin-1-ylethoxy)phenyl]-3H-thieno[3,2-d]pyrimidin-4-one
- CAS Number: 515141-51-2
- PubChem CID: 9826520
- ChemSpider: 8002263
- UNII: 4R0136W1PR
- CompTox Dashboard (EPA): DTXSID70199490
- ECHA InfoCard: 100.230.542

Chemical and physical data
- Formula: C_{25}H_{24}ClN_{3}O_{3}S
- Molar mass: 482.00 g·mol^{−1}
- 3D model (JSmol): Interactive image
- SMILES: C5CCCN5CCOc3ccc(cc3OC)-n1cnc2cc(sc2c1=O)-c(cc4)ccc4Cl
- InChI: InChI=1S/C25H24ClN3O3S/c1-31-22-14-19(8-9-21(22)32-13-12-28-10-2-3-11-28)29-16-27-20-15-23(33-24(20)25(29)30)17-4-6-18(26)7-5-17/h4-9,14-16H,2-3,10-13H2,1H3; Key:MWULMTACIBZPGN-UHFFFAOYSA-N

GW-803430 (GW-3430) is a drug used in scientific research and is a selective non-peptide antagonist at the melanin concentrating hormone receptor MCH_{1}. In animal studies it has anxiolytic, antidepressant and anorectic effects.
