= Sovateltide =

Chemical compound

Clinical data
- Trade names: Tyvalzi
- Other names: IRL-1620; PMZ-1620

Legal status
- Legal status: Rx in India

Identifiers
- IUPAC name: Suc-Asp-Glu-Glu-Ala-Val-Tyr-Phe-Ala-His-Leu-Asp-Ile-Ile-Trp-OH
- CAS Number: 142569-99-1
- PubChem CID: 16133819
- IUPHAR/BPS: 3886
- ChemSpider: 17287647
- UNII: 11X778QIZS
- ChEMBL: ChEMBL3188091
- CompTox Dashboard (EPA): DTXSID70162088

Chemical and physical data
- Formula: C_{86}H_{117}N_{17}O_{27}
- Molar mass: 1820.974 g·mol^{−1}
- 3D model (JSmol): Interactive image
- SMILES: CC[C@H](C)[C@@H](C(=O)N[C@@H]([C@@H](C)CC)C(=O)N[C@@H](CC1=CNC2=CC=CC=C21)C(=O)O)NC(=O)[C@H](CC(=O)O)NC(=O)[C@H](CC(C)C)NC(=O)[C@H](CC3=CNC=N3)NC(=O)[C@H](C)NC(=O)[C@H](CC4=CC=CC=C4)NC(=O)[C@H](CC5=CC=C(C=C5)O)NC(=O)[C@H](C(C)C)NC(=O)[C@H](C)NC(=O)[C@H](CCC(=O)O)NC(=O)[C@H](CCC(=O)O)NC(=O)[C@H](CC(=O)O)NC(=O)CCC(=O)O
- InChI: InChI=1S/C86H117N17O27/c1-11-44(7)71(84(127)100-63(86(129)130)35-50-39-88-54-21-17-16-20-53(50)54)103-85(128)72(45(8)12-2)102-82(125)62(38-69(114)115)98-78(121)57(32-42(3)4)96-80(123)60(36-51-40-87-41-89-51)95-73(116)46(9)91-77(120)58(33-48-18-14-13-15-19-48)97-79(122)59(34-49-22-24-52(104)25-23-49)99-83(126)70(43(5)6)101-74(117)47(10)90-75(118)55(26-29-65(106)107)93-76(119)56(27-30-66(108)109)94-81(124)61(37-68(112)113)92-64(105)28-31-67(110)111/h13-25,39-47,55-63,70-72,88,104H,11-12,26-38H2,1-10H3,(H,87,89)(H,90,118)(H,91,120)(H,92,105)(H,93,119)(H,94,124)(H,95,116)(H,96,123)(H,97,122)(H,98,121)(H,99,126)(H,100,127)(H,101,117)(H,102,125)(H,103,128)(H,106,107)(H,108,109)(H,110,111)(H,112,113)(H,114,115)(H,129,130)/t44-,45-,46-,47-,55-,56-,57-,58-,59-,60-,61-,62-,63-,70-,71-,72-/m0/s1; Key:DXPHNGAMYPPTBJ-TZMIJSMNSA-N

Sovateltide (development names IRL-1620 and PMZ-1620, sold in India under the brand name Tyvalzi) is a synthetic analog of endothelin-1 that works as a selective endothelin-B receptor agonist. In May 2023, it was approved in India to treat acute ischemic stroke. The drug was developed by Pharmazz. Sovateltide stimulates neural progenitor cells in the brain and promotes neurovascular remodeling by forming new neurons (neurogenesis) and blood vessels (angiogenesis). Sovateltide also protects neural mitochondria and enhances their biogenesis.
