= Corticorelin =

Chemical compound

Clinical data
- AHFS/Drugs.com: International Drug Names
- ATC code: V04CD04 (WHO)

Pharmacokinetic data
- Elimination half-life: 9 minutes

Identifiers
- CAS Number: 86784-80-7
- PubChem CID: 16186200
- DrugBank: DB05394
- ChemSpider: 17315094
- UNII: 305OE8862Y
- KEGG: D03905
- CompTox Dashboard (EPA): DTXSID90229925

Chemical and physical data
- Formula: C_{208}H_{344}N_{60}O_{63}S_{2}
- Molar mass: 4757.52 g·mol^{−1}
- 3D model (JSmol): Interactive image
- SMILES: [H]/N=C(\N)/NCCC[C@@H](C(=O)N[C@@H](C)C(=O)N[C@@H](CCC(=O)O)C(=O)N[C@@H](CCC(=O)N)C(=O)N[C@@H](CC(C)C)C(=O)N[C@@H](C)C(=O)N[C@@H](CCC(=O)N)C(=O)N[C@@H](CCC(=O)N)C(=O)N[C@@H](C)C(=O)N[C@@H](Cc1c[nH]cn1)C(=O)N[C@@H](CO)C(=O)N[C@@H](CC(=O)N)C(=O)N[C@@H](CCCN/C(=N/[H])/N)C(=O)N[C@@H](CCCCN)C(=O)N[C@@H](CC(C)C)C(=O)N[C@@H](CCSC)C(=O)N[C@@H](CCC(=O)O)C(=O)N[C@@H]([C@@H](C)CC)C(=O)N[C@@H]([C@@H](C)CC)C(=O)N)NC(=O)[C@H](C)NC(=O)[C@H](CCSC)NC(=O)[C@H](CCC(=O)O)NC(=O)[C@H](CC(C)C)NC(=O)[C@H](C(C)C)NC(=O)[C@H](CCC(=O)O)NC(=O)[C@H](CCCN/C(=N/[H])/N)NC(=O)[C@H](CC(C)C)NC(=O)[C@H](CC(C)C)NC(=O)[C@H](Cc2c[nH]cn2)NC(=O)[C@H](Cc3ccccc3)NC(=O)[C@H]([C@@H](C)O)NC(=O)[C@H](CC(C)C)NC(=O)[C@H](CC(=O)O)NC(=O)[C@H](CC(C)C)NC(=O)[C@H](CO)NC(=O)[C@H]([C@@H](C)CC)NC(=O)[C@@H]4CCCN4C(=O)[C@@H]5CCCN5C(=O)[C@H](CCC(=O)O)NC(=O)[C@H](CCC(=O)O)NC(=O)[C@H](CO)N
- InChI: InChI=1S/C208H344N60O63S2/c1-30-106(20)161(165(215)291)263-202(328)163(108(22)32-3)264-184(310)129(58-67-157(285)286)243-182(308)131(70-78-333-29)246-187(313)134(80-99(6)7)250-176(302)118(45-36-37-71-209)237-174(300)120(47-39-73-225-207(218)219)239-194(320)143(89-152(214)276)256-197(323)145(94-270)260-193(319)141(87-115-91-222-96-227-115)248-169(295)112(26)230-172(298)122(51-60-149(211)273)240-177(303)123(52-61-150(212)274)234-168(294)111(25)232-185(311)133(79-98(4)5)249-181(307)124(53-62-151(213)275)241-178(304)125(54-63-153(277)278)235-167(293)110(24)229-171(297)119(46-38-72-224-206(216)217)233-166(292)109(23)231-173(299)130(69-77-332-28)245-179(305)127(56-65-155(281)282)244-188(314)138(84-103(14)15)258-200(326)160(105(18)19)262-183(309)128(57-66-156(283)284)242-175(301)121(48-40-74-226-208(220)221)238-186(312)135(81-100(8)9)251-189(315)136(82-101(10)11)252-192(318)142(88-116-92-223-97-228-116)255-191(317)140(86-114-43-34-33-35-44-114)259-203(329)164(113(27)272)266-196(322)139(85-104(16)17)253-195(321)144(90-159(289)290)257-190(316)137(83-102(12)13)254-198(324)146(95-271)261-201(327)162(107(21)31-2)265-199(325)147-49-41-75-267(147)205(331)148-50-42-76-268(148)204(330)132(59-68-158(287)288)247-180(306)126(55-64-154(279)280)236-170(296)117(210)93-269/h33-35,43-44,91-92,96-113,117-148,160-164,269-272H,30-32,36-42,45-90,93-95,209-210H2,1-29H3,(H2,211,273)(H2,212,274)(H2,213,275)(H2,214,276)(H2,215,291)(H,222,227)(H,223,228)(H,229,297)(H,230,298)(H,231,299)(H,232,311)(H,233,292)(H,234,294)(H,235,293)(H,236,296)(H,237,300)(H,238,312)(H,239,320)(H,240,303)(H,241,304)(H,242,301)(H,243,308)(H,244,314)(H,245,305)(H,246,313)(H,247,306)(H,248,295)(H,249,307)(H,250,302)(H,251,315)(H,252,318)(H,253,321)(H,254,324)(H,255,317)(H,256,323)(H,257,316)(H,258,326)(H,259,329)(H,260,319)(H,261,327)(H,262,309)(H,263,328)(H,264,310)(H,265,325)(H,266,322)(H,277,278)(H,279,280)(H,281,282)(H,283,284)(H,285,286)(H,287,288)(H,289,290)(H4,216,217,224)(H4,218,219,225)(H4,220,221,226)/t106-,107-,108-,109-,110-,111-,112-,113+,117-,118-,119-,120-,121-,122-,123-,124-,125-,126-,127-,128-,129-,130-,131-,132-,133-,134-,135-,136-,137-,138-,139-,140-,141-,142-,143-,144-,145-,146-,147-,148-,160-,161-,162-,163-,164-/m0/s1; Key:GBONBLHJMVUBSJ-FAUHKOHMSA-N

Corticorelin (INN, trade name Xerecept) is a diagnostic agent. It is a synthetic form of human corticotropin-releasing hormone (hCRH).

== Medical uses ==
The corticorelin stimulation test helps to differentiate between the causes for adrenocorticotropic hormone (ACTH)-dependent hypercortisolism. It is used to distinguish a pituitary source of excessive ACTH secretion from a different source.

- If corticorelin injection increases plasma levels of ACTH and cortisol, a diagnosis of Cushing's disease is achieved (ACTH of pituitary origin).
- If corticorelin injection leads to little or no response in plasma levels of ACTH or cortisol, a diagnosis of ectopic ACTH syndrome is confirmed.

== Side effects ==
The most common side effects (in 1% to 10% of patients) are transient dysosmia and dysgeusia (distortion of the sense of smell and taste), as well as a sensation of warmth. About 0.1 to 1% of patients experience hypersensitivity, hypotension (lowering of blood pressure), tachycardia (increased heart rate), flush, dyspnoea (breathing difficulties), a cold sensation in the throat, the urge to urinate, and dizziness. Pituitary apoplexy has been reported in patients with pituitary tumours.

== Interactions ==
The effects of corticorelin are reduced by corticosteroids, antihistamines, antiserotonergics and oxytocin. They are amplified by vasopressin and its analogues.

== See also ==
- ACTH stimulation test
- Dexamethasone suppression test
- Metyrapone
- Pituitary-adrenal axis
- Tetracosactide
