= Galmic =

Chemical compound

Identifiers
- IUPAC name: methyl 6-amino-2-[[(4R,11R,18R)-18-(cyclohexylmethylcarbamoyl)-11-(9H-fluoren-9-ylcarbamoyl)-4,7,11,14,18,21-hexamethyl-2,9,16-trioxo-6,13,20-trioxa-3,10,17,22,23,24-hexazatetracyclo[17.2.1.15,8.112,15]tetracosa-1(21),5(24),7,12(23),14,19(22)-hexaene-4-carbonyl]amino]hexanoate
- CAS Number: 762241-24-7
- PubChem CID: 11636593
- ChemSpider: 25046661
- ChEMBL: ChEMBL578918

Chemical and physical data
- Formula: C_{51}H_{60}N_{10}O_{11}
- Molar mass: 989.100 g·mol^{−1}
- 3D model (JSmol): Interactive image
- SMILES: c7cccc3c7-c4ccccc4C3NC(=O)C(C)(c(oc6C)nc6C(=O)NC2(C)C(=O)NC(C(=O)OC)CCCCN)NC(=O)c1nc(oc1C)C(C)(NC(=O)c5nc2oc5C)C(=O)NCC8CCCCC8
- InChI: InChI=1S/C51H60N10O11/c1-26-36-41(64)61-51(6,45(68)55-38-32-21-13-11-19-30(32)31-20-12-14-22-33(31)38)48-58-37(28(3)72-48)40(63)60-50(5,44(67)54-34(42(65)69-7)23-15-16-24-52)47-57-35(27(2)71-47)39(62)59-49(4,46(56-36)70-26)43(66)53-25-29-17-9-8-10-18-29/h11-14,19-22,29,34,38H,8-10,15-18,23-25,52H2,1-7H3,(H,53,66)(H,54,67)(H,55,68)(H,59,62)(H,60,63)(H,61,64)/t34-,49-,50-,51-/m0/s1

Galmic is a drug which acts as a selective, non-peptide agonist at the galanin receptors GAL_{R}. It has anticonvulsant, antidepressant and analgesic effects in animal studies, but also inhibits memory functions.
