= ML-154 =

Chemical compound

Clinical data
- ATC code: none

Identifiers
- IUPAC name: 3-(Diphenylphosphinothioyl)-2-methyl-1-[(2E)-3-phenyl-2-propen-1-yl]imidazo[1,2-a]pyridinium bromide
- CAS Number: 1345964-89-7
- PubChem CID: 46930969
- ChemSpider: 26360842
- UNII: QF6BKX96N5
- CompTox Dashboard (EPA): DTXSID901032908

Chemical and physical data
- Formula: C_{29}H_{26}BrN_{2}PS
- Molar mass: 545.48 g·mol^{−1}
- 3D model (JSmol): Interactive image
- SMILES: [Br-].C1(=CC=CC=C1)[P](=S)(C2=C([N+](=C3C=CC=C[N]23)C\C=C\C4=CC=CC=C4)C)C5=CC=CC=C5
- InChI: InChI=1S/C29H26N2PS.BrH/c1-24-29(32(33,26-17-7-3-8-18-26)27-19-9-4-10-20-27)31-22-12-11-21-28(31)30(24)23-13-16-25-14-5-2-6-15-25;/h2-22H,23H2,1H3;1H/q+1;/p-1/b16-13+; Key:CJAQCMBWGUOBIX-ZUQRMPMESA-M

ML-154 (NCGC-84) is a drug which acts as a selective, non-peptide antagonist at the neuropeptide S receptor NPSR. In animal studies it decreases self-administration of alcohol in addicted rats, and lowers motivation for alcohol rewards, suggesting a potential application for NPS antagonists in the treatment of alcoholism.

== See also ==
- Neuropeptide S receptor
