= LBT-3627 =

LBT-3627 is an experimental peptide drug derived from vasoactive intestinal peptide (VIP) intended to modulate the behavior of immune cells in cases of neurodegenerative disease such that they protect dopamine-producing cells rather than attack them. The drug is currently being studied for its potential use in the treatment of Parkinson's disease.

== Function ==
LBT-3627 specifically targets the VIP_{2} receptor. The drug may also have an effect on microglia. LBT-3627 has been shown to be more stable in the body as compared to VIP.

== History and development ==
Researchers at the University of Nebraska Medical Center and Longevity Biotech, Inc. in Philadelphia first demonstrated the use of the drug in mouse models.

A phase I trial for humans was planned for 2017, but as of 2018 it was still in the preclinical development stage.
