= Efpeglenatide =

Legal status
- Legal status: Investigational

Identifiers
- CAS Number: 1296200-77-5
- DrugBank: DB15650
- UNII: 3M1V5Z2270
- KEGG: D11947
- ChEMBL: ChEMBL4650470

Efpeglenatide is a GLP-1 receptor agonist under development for the treatment of type 2 diabetes and obesity and reducing the risk of cardiovascular incidents in people with these conditions. Its developer is Hanmi Pharmaceutical.
