= Zibotentan =

Names
- Preferred IUPAC name N-(3-Methoxy-5-methylpyrazin-2-yl)-2-[4-(1,3,4-oxadiazol-2-yl)phenyl]pyridine-3-sulfonamide
- Other names ZD4054

Identifiers
CAS Number	186497-07-4
3D model (JSmol)	Interactive image
ChEBI	CHEBI:94573
ChemSpider	8085875
ECHA InfoCard	100.171.075
IUPHAR/BPS	3539
PubChem CID	9910224
UNII	8054MM4902
CompTox Dashboard (EPA)	DTXSID70870171
- InChI: InChI=1S/C19H16N6O4S/c1-12-10-21-17(19(23-12)28-2)25-30(26,27)15-4-3-9-20-16(15)13-5-7-14(8-6-13)18-24-22-11-29-18/h3-11H,1-2H3,(H,21,25) Key: FJHHZXWJVIEFGJ-UHFFFAOYSA-N; InChI=1/C19H16N6O4S/c1-12-10-21-17(19(23-12)28-2)25-30(26,27)15-4-3-9-20-16(15)13-5-7-14(8-6-13)18-24-22-11-29-18/h3-11H,1-2H3,(H,21,25) Key: FJHHZXWJVIEFGJ-UHFFFAOYAL
- SMILES: O=S(=O)(Nc1ncc(nc1OC)C)c4cccnc4c3ccc(c2nnco2)cc3

Properties
Chemical formula	C_{19}H_{16}N_{6}O_{4}S
Molar mass	424.44 g·mol^{−1}
- Except where otherwise noted, data are given for materials in their standard state (at 25 °C [77 °F], 100 kPa). verify (what is ?) Infobox references

Zibotentan (INN; development code ZD4054) is an experimental anti-cancer drug candidate in development by AstraZeneca. It is an endothelin receptor antagonist.

Zibotentan was granted fast track status for the treatment of prostate cancer by the FDA.

It failed a phase III clinical trial for prostate cancer, but other trials are planned. Tolerability of zibotentan plus docetaxel has been evaluated.

Zibotentan has also been studied in clinical trials for treatment of breast cancer, colorectal cancer, non-small cell lung cancer, ovarian cancer, scleroderma-related renal disease, bone metastasis, and heart failure.
