= Neuromedin N =

Identifiers
CAS Number	102577-25-3
3D model (JSmol)	Interactive image
ChemSpider	8115921
IUPHAR/BPS	1578
PubChem CID	9940301
UNII	8X4C39J64Q
CompTox Dashboard (EPA)	DTXSID20145280
- InChI: InChI=1S/C38H63N7O8/c1-7-23(5)31(36(50)42-29(38(52)53)20-22(3)4)43-34(48)28(21-25-14-16-26(46)17-15-25)41-35(49)30-13-11-19-45(30)37(51)32(24(6)8-2)44-33(47)27(40)12-9-10-18-39/h14-17,22-24,27-32,46H,7-13,18-21,39-40H2,1-6H3,(H,41,49)(H,42,50)(H,43,48)(H,44,47)(H,52,53)/t23-,24-,27-,28-,29-,30-,31-,32-/m0/s1 Key: RZMLVIHXZGQADB-YLUGYNJDSA-N
- SMILES: OC([C@H](CC(C)C)NC([C@@]([C@H](CC)C)([H])NC([C@H](CC1=CC=C(O)C=C1)NC([C@@H]2CCCN2C([C@](NC([C@@H](N)CCCCN)=O)([H])[C@H](CC)C)=O)=O)=O)=O)=O

Properties
Chemical formula	C_{38}H_{63}N_{7}O_{8}
Molar mass	745.949
- Except where otherwise noted, data are given for materials in their standard state (at 25 °C [77 °F], 100 kPa). verify (what is ?) Infobox references

Neuromedin N

Identifiers
- Symbol: NN
- NCBI gene: 4922
- HGNC: 8038

Other data
- Locus: Chr. 12 q21

Neuromedin N is a neuropeptide derived from the same precursor polypeptide as neurotensin, and with similar but subtly distinct expression and effects. Composed of the amino acid sequence Lys-Ile-Pro-Tyr-Ile-Leu, neuromedin N is homologous to neurotensin, both of whose sequences are found on the pro neurotensin/neuromedin N precursor C-terminus. Both sequences of neuromedin N as well as neurotensin are flanked by Lys-Arg amino acids, which comprise a consensus sequence for the endoprotease proprotein convertase. Neuromedin N is primarily synthesized in the neural and intestinal tissues of mammals; in studies performed in mice, neuromedin N's physiological effects were shown to include hypothermia and analgesia, arising from the peptide's ligand association to and interaction with neurotensin type 2 (NTS2) G protein-coupled receptors.
