= HT-2157 =

Chemical compound

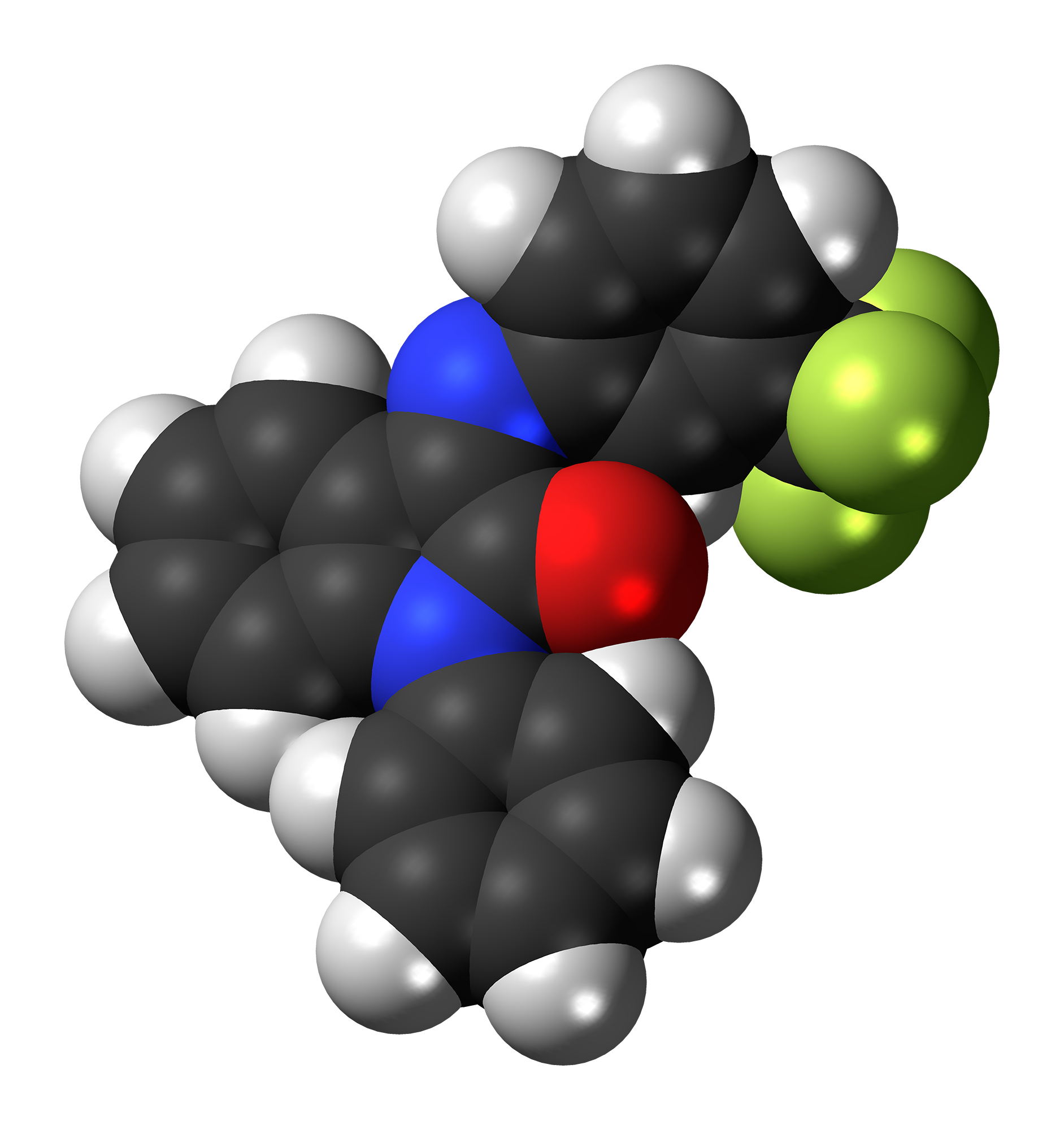

Clinical data
- ATC code: none

Identifiers
- IUPAC name: 1-Phenyl-3-[3-(trifluoromethyl)phenyl]iminoindol-2-one
- CAS Number: 303149-14-6
- PubChem CID: 1471834
- IUPHAR/BPS: 6126
- ChemSpider: 1213983
- UNII: J4DRJ9BFS1

Chemical and physical data
- Formula: C_{21}H_{13}F_{3}N_{2}O
- Molar mass: 366.343 g·mol^{−1}
- 3D model (JSmol): Interactive image
- SMILES: c14ccccc4n(-c3ccccc3)c(=O)c1=N\c(c2)cccc2C(F)(F)F
- InChI: InChI=1S/C21H13F3N2O/c22-21(23,24)14-7-6-8-15(13-14)25-19-17-11-4-5-12-18(17)26(20(19)27)16-9-2-1-3-10-16/h1-13H/b25-19+; Key:TXCGMRVPXUBHAL-NCELDCMTSA-N

HT-2157 (former development code SNAP-37889) is a drug which acts as a selective non-peptide antagonist for the receptor GAL-3, which is usually activated by the neuropeptide galanin. Blocking this receptor with HT-2157 produced increased serotonin release, as well as producing antidepressant and anxiolytic effects in animal studies, and it was also being researched for treatment of cognitive dysfunction. All human clinical trials were terminated due to safety concerns however, and new GAL-3 antagonists are now being sought instead.
