= Olcegepant =

Chemical compound

Clinical data
- ATC code: None

Identifiers
- IUPAC name: N-[(1R)-2-[[(1S)-5-Amino-1-[[4-(pyridin-4-yl)piperazin-1-yl]carbonyl]pentyl]amino]-1-(3,5-dibromo-4-hydroxybenzyl)-2-oxoethyl]-4-(2-oxo-1,4-dihydroquinazolin-3(2H)-yl)piperidine-1-carboxamide
- CAS Number: 204697-65-4
- PubChem CID: 6918509
- ChemSpider: 5293706
- UNII: WOA5J8TX6M
- CompTox Dashboard (EPA): DTXSID10174443

Chemical and physical data
- Formula: C_{38}H_{47}Br_{2}N_{9}O_{5}
- Molar mass: 869.660 g·mol^{−1}
- 3D model (JSmol): Interactive image
- SMILES: C1CN(CCC1N2CC3=CC=CC=C3NC2=O)C(=O)N[C@H](CC4=CC(=C(C(=C4)Br)O)Br)C(=O)N[C@@H](CCCCN)C(=O)N5CCN(CC5)C6=CC=NC=C6
- InChI: InChI=1S/C38H47Br2N9O5/c39-29-21-25(22-30(40)34(29)50)23-33(45-37(53)48-15-10-28(11-16-48)49-24-26-5-1-2-6-31(26)44-38(49)54)35(51)43-32(7-3-4-12-41)36(52)47-19-17-46(18-20-47)27-8-13-42-14-9-27/h1-2,5-6,8-9,13-14,21-22,28,32-33,50H,3-4,7,10-12,15-20,23-24,41H2,(H,43,51)(H,44,54)(H,45,53)/t32-,33+/m0/s1; Key:ITIXDWVDFFXNEG-JHOUSYSJSA-N

Olcegepant (INN, code name BIBN-4096BS) is a calcitonin gene-related peptide receptor antagonist being studied as a potential treatment for migraines.

A 2013 meta-analysis found olcegepant and telcagepant were effective and safe compared to placebo.

== See also ==
- Telcagepant
