= Telcagepant =

Chemical compound

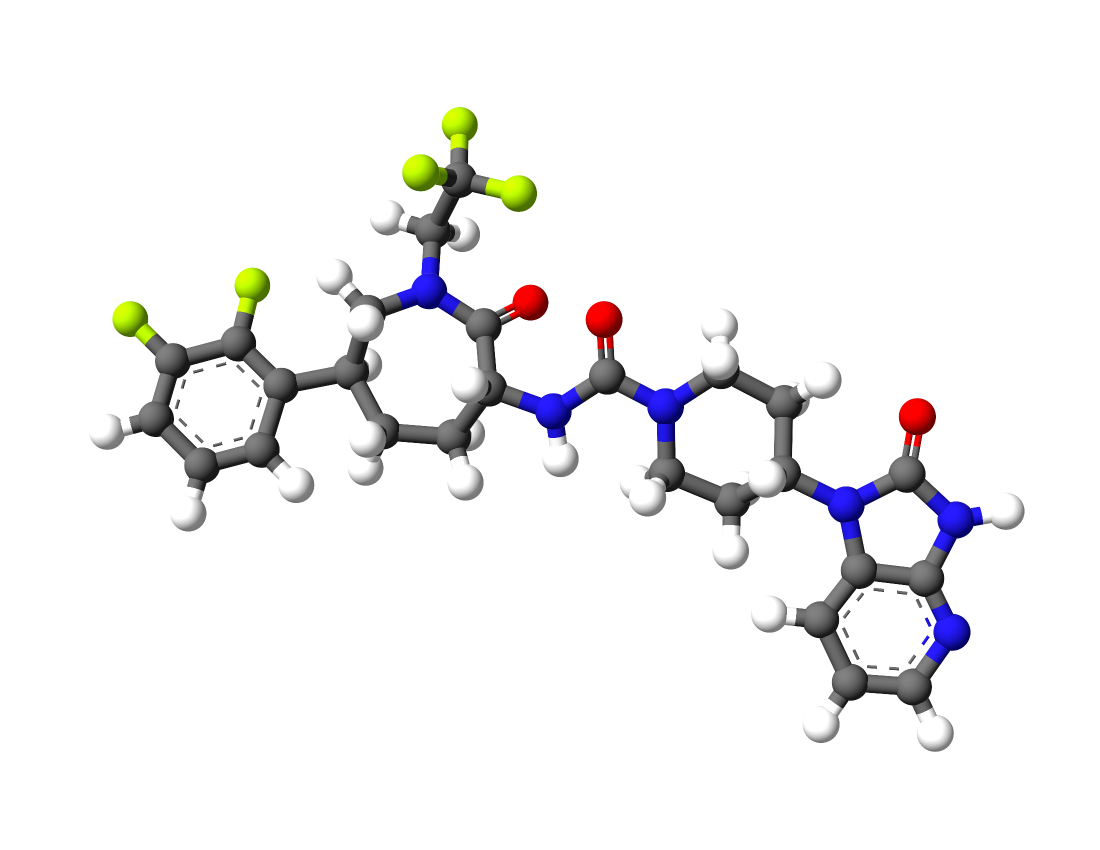

Clinical data
- Routes of administration: Oral
- ATC code: none

Legal status
- Legal status: Development terminated

Pharmacokinetic data
- Elimination half-life: 5–8 hours

Identifiers
- IUPAC name: N-[(3R,6S)-6-(2,3-Difluorophenyl)hexahydro-2-oxo-1-(2,2,2-trifluoroethyl)-1H-azepin-3-yl]-4-(2,3-dihydro-2-oxo-1H-imidazo[4,5-b]pyridin-1-yl)-1-piperidinecarboxamide
- CAS Number: 781649-09-0
- PubChem CID: 11319053
- IUPHAR/BPS: 703
- ChemSpider: 9494017
- UNII: D42O649ALL
- KEGG: D09391
- ChEMBL: ChEMBL236593
- CompTox Dashboard (EPA): DTXSID50999410

Chemical and physical data
- Formula: C_{26}H_{27}F_{5}N_{6}O_{3}
- Molar mass: 566.533 g·mol^{−1}
- 3D model (JSmol): Interactive image
- SMILES: C1C[C@H](C(=O)N(C[C@@H]1C2=C(C(=CC=C2)F)F)CC(F)(F)F)NC(=O)N3CCC(CC3)N4C5=C(NC4=O)N=CC=C5
- InChI: InChI=1S/C26H27F5N6O3/c27-18-4-1-3-17(21(18)28)15-6-7-19(23(38)36(13-15)14-26(29,30)31)33-24(39)35-11-8-16(9-12-35)37-20-5-2-10-32-22(20)34-25(37)40/h1-5,10,15-16,19H,6-9,11-14H2,(H,33,39)(H,32,34,40)/t15-,19-/m1/s1; Key:CGDZXLJGHVKVIE-DNVCBOLYSA-N

Telcagepant (INN; development code MK-0974) is a calcitonin gene-related peptide receptor antagonist which was an investigational drug for the acute treatment and prevention of migraine, developed by Merck & Co.

In the acute treatment of migraine, it was found to have equal efficacy to rizatriptan and zolmitriptan.

A Phase IIa clinical trial studying telcagepant for the prophylaxis of episodic migraine was stopped on March 26, 2009, after the "identification of two patients with significant elevations in serum transaminases". A memo to study locations stated that telcagepant had preliminarily been reported to increase the hepatic liver enzyme alanine transaminase (ALT) levels in "11 out of 660 randomized (double-blinded) study participants." All study participants were told to stop taking the medication.

In July 2011, Merck announced that it had discontinued development of telcagepant.

== See also ==
- Olcegepant
