= Proglucagon =

Protein that is a precursor of glucagon

GCG
Available structures
PDB	Ortholog search: PDBe RCSB
PDB	List of PDB id codes 1BH0, 1NAU, 2G49, 2M5P, 2M5Q,%%s4ZGM, 4APD, 3IOL, 1D0R,%%s2L64, 2L63

Identifiers
- Aliases: GCG, GLP1, glucagon, GRPP, GLP-1, GLP2
- External IDs: OMIM: 138030; MGI: 95674; HomoloGene: 136497; GeneCards: GCG; OMA:GCG - orthologs

Gene location (Human)
Chr.	Chromosome 2 (human)
Band	2q24.2	Start	162,142,882 bp
Band	2q24.2	End	162,152,404 bp

Gene location (Mouse)
Chr.	Chromosome 2 (mouse)
Band	2 C1.3|2 35.85 cM	Start	62,304,874 bp
Band	2 C1.3|2 35.85 cM	End	62,313,994 bp
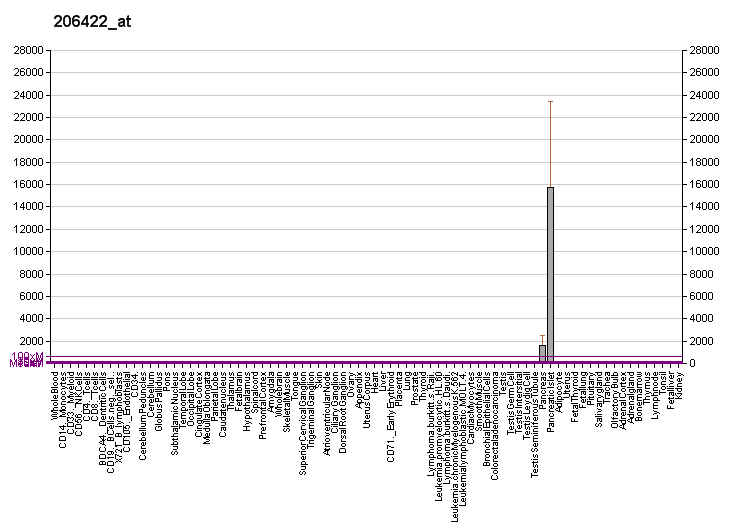
RNA expression pattern
Bgee	Human / Mouse (ortholog); Top expressed in: beta cell; body of pancreas; rectum; mucosa of sigmoid colon; mucosa of ileum; testicle; mucosa of transverse colon; epithelium of colon; jejunal mucosa; appendix / Top expressed in: islet of Langerhans; crypt of lieberkuhn of small intestine; ileum; large intestine; colon; lens; Paneth cell; left colon; jejunum; epithelium of small intestine; More reference expression data
BioGPS	More reference expression data
Gene ontology
Molecular function	protein binding; identical protein binding; hormone activity; glucagon receptor binding; signaling receptor binding
Cellular component	cytoplasm; endoplasmic reticulum lumen; extracellular region; secretory granule lumen; extracellular space
Biological process	negative regulation of execution phase of apoptosis; G protein-coupled receptor signaling pathway; regulation of insulin secretion; cellular response to glucagon stimulus; positive regulation of peptidyl-serine phosphorylation; positive regulation of calcium ion import; positive regulation of histone H3-K4 methylation; positive regulation of peptidyl-threonine phosphorylation; feeding behavior; positive regulation of ERK1 and ERK2 cascade; positive regulation of protein binding; cell population proliferation; signal transduction; positive regulation of protein kinase activity; adenylate cyclase-modulating G protein-coupled receptor signaling pathway; protein kinase A signaling; positive regulation of insulin secretion involved in cellular response to glucose stimulus; response to starvation; negative regulation of apoptotic process; regulation of signaling receptor activity; adenylate cyclase-activating G protein-coupled receptor signaling pathway
Sources:Amigo / QuickGO
Orthologs
Species	Human	Mouse
Entrez	2641	14526
Ensembl	ENSG00000115263	ENSMUSG00000000394
UniProt	P01275	P55095
RefSeq (mRNA)	NM_002054	NM_008100
RefSeq (protein)	NP_002045	NP_032126
Location (UCSC)	Chr 2: 162.14 – 162.15 Mb	Chr 2: 62.3 – 62.31 Mb
PubMed search
- Wikidata
View/Edit Human	View/Edit Mouse

Proglucagon is a protein that is a precursor of glucagon and several other components. It is cleaved from preproglucagon. Proglucagon is generated in the alpha cells of the pancreas and in the intestinal L cells in the distal ileum and colon.

Preproglucagon in humans is encoded by the GCG gene and is composed of 180 amino-acid residues.

== Function and Terminology ==
The “pre-” prefix of preproglucagon indicates that it is composed of proglucagon together with a signal peptide. The signal peptide is a 20 amino acid fragment that signals that the protein needs to be secreted out of the cell. Proglucagon has the “pro-“ prefix because it is a prohormone, which means it is an inactivate precursor that needs to be further modified in order to produce active hormone(s). In particular, proglucagon is cleaved (cut) into different active hormones depending on the organ. Omitting various inactive fragments, preproglucagon is cleaved into the following:

=== Pancreas ===
- Signal peptide (1-20)
- Glicentin-related pancreatic polypeptide (GRPP, 21-50)
- Glucagon (53–81)

=== Gut and Brain ===
- Signal peptide (1-20)
- Glicentin (21–89)
- Oxyntomodulin (OXY or OXM, 53–89) – A further cleavage of Glicentin
- Glucagon-like peptide 1 (GLP-1, 92–128) – first seven residues further cleaved
- Glucagon-like peptide 2 (GLP-2, 146–178)
