= Linsitinib =

Clinical data
- Other names: OSI-906

Identifiers
- IUPAC name: 3-[8-amino-1-(2-phenylquinolin-7-yl)imidazo[1,5-a]pyrazin-3-yl]-1-methylcyclobutan-1-ol
- CAS Number: 867160-71-2
- PubChem CID: 11640390
- DrugBank: DB06075
- UNII: 15A52GPT8T
- KEGG: D09925
- ChEBI: CHEBI:91402
- ChEMBL: ChEMBL1091644
- CompTox Dashboard (EPA): DTXSID401007055

Chemical and physical data
- Formula: C_{26}H_{23}N_{5}O
- Molar mass: 421.504 g·mol^{−1}
- 3D model (JSmol): Interactive image
- SMILES: CC1(CC(C1)C2=NC(=C3N2C=CN=C3N)C4=CC5=C(C=C4)C=CC(=N5)C6=CC=CC=C6)O
- InChI: InChI=InChI=1S/C26H23N5O/c1-26(32)14-19(15-26)25-30-22(23-24(27)28-11-12-31(23)25)18-8-7-17-9-10-20(29-21(17)13-18)16-5-3-2-4-6-16/h2-13,19,32H,14-15H2,1H3,(H2,27,28); Key:PKCDDUHJAFVJJB-UHFFFAOYSA-N

Linsitinib is an experimental drug candidate for the treatment of various types of cancer. It is an inhibitor of the insulin receptor and of the insulin-like growth factor 1 receptor (IGF-1R). This prevents tumor cell proliferation and induces tumor cell apoptosis.

Linsitinib was granted orphan drug designation for adrenocortical carcinoma in March 2012.

Phase II clinical trials were initiated for multiple myeloma, ovarian cancer, hepatocellular carcinoma, and NSCLC, but subsatisfactory results caused research for these indications to be discontinued. A phase III clinical trial found that linsitinib did not increase survival in patients with adrenocortical carcinoma. As of 2017, no clinical trials were in progress.
