= Lu AA-33810 =

Chemical compound

Clinical data
- Other names: Lu AA-33810
- ATC code: None

Identifiers
- IUPAC name: N-[(trans-4-[(4,5-Dihydro[1]benzothiepino[5,4-d]thiazol-2-yl)amino]cyclohexyl)methyl]methanesulfonamide
- CAS Number: 304008-29-5
- PubChem CID: 22254068
- ChemSpider: 21223462
- ChEMBL: ChEMBL1836317
- CompTox Dashboard (EPA): DTXSID801028445

Chemical and physical data
- Formula: C_{19}H_{25}N_{3}O_{2}S_{3}
- Molar mass: 423.61 g·mol^{−1}
- 3D model (JSmol): Interactive image
- SMILES: O=S(C)(=O)NCC3CCC(CC3)Nc4sc2CCSc1ccccc1-c2n4
- InChI: InChI=1S/C19H25N3O2S3/c1-27(23,24)20-12-13-6-8-14(9-7-13)21-19-22-18-15-4-2-3-5-16(15)25-11-10-17(18)26-19/h2-5,13-14,20H,6-12H2,1H3,(H,21,22); Key:UWSBTSAJZMIHBL-UHFFFAOYSA-N

Lu AA-33810 is a drug developed by Lundbeck, which acts as a potent and highly selective antagonist for the neuropeptide Y receptor Y_{5}, with a Ki of 1.5nM and around 3300x selectivity over the related Y_{1}, Y_{2} and Y_{4} receptors. In animal studies it produced anorectic, antidepressant and anxiolytic effects, and further research is now being conducted into its possible medical application in the treatment of eating disorders.
