= Galnon =

Chemical compound

Identifiers
- IUPAC name: 9H-fluoren-9-ylmethyl N-[(2S)-1-([(2S)-6-amino-1-[(4-methyl-2-oxochromen-7- yl)amino]-1-oxohexan-2-yl]amino)-3-cyclohexyl-1-oxopropan-2-yl]carbamate
- CAS Number: 475115-35-6
- PubChem CID: 5311268
- IUPHAR/BPS: 6118
- ChemSpider: 4470781
- UNII: NK59Y4NQ33
- ChEMBL: ChEMBL592414
- CompTox Dashboard (EPA): DTXSID301028771

Chemical and physical data
- Formula: C_{40}H_{46}N_{4}O_{6}
- Molar mass: 678.830 g·mol^{−1}
- 3D model (JSmol): Interactive image
- SMILES: Cc3cc(=O)oc6cc(ccc36)NC(=O)C(CCCCN)NC(=O)C(CC5CCCCC5)NC(=O)OCC1c2ccccc2-c4c1cccc4
- InChI: InChI=1S/C40H46N4O6/c1-25-21-37(45)50-36-23-27(18-19-28(25)36)42-38(46)34(17-9-10-20-41)43-39(47)35(22-26-11-3-2-4-12-26)44-40(48)49-24-33-31-15-7-5-13-29(31)30-14-6-8-16-32(30)33/h5-8,13-16,18-19,21,23,26,33-35H,2-4,9-12,17,20,22,24,41H2,1H3,(H,42,46)(H,43,47)(H,44,48)/t34-,35-/m0/s1; Key:IKNOZZKXIDSTRN-PXLJZGITSA-N

Galnon is a drug which acts as a selective, non-peptide agonist at the galanin receptors GAL_{R}. It has anticonvulsant, anxiolytic, anorectic and amnestic effects in animal studies.
