= Montirelin =

TRH analog with use for CNS disorders

Clinical data
- Other names: CG 3703, CG-3703, CNK 602A, CNK 603, CNK-602A, CNK-603, NS-3.

Identifiers
- IUPAC name: (3R,6R)-N-[(2S)-1-[(2S)-2-carbamoylpyrrolidin-1-yl]-3-(1H-imidazol-5-yl)-1-oxopropan-2-yl]-6-methyl-5-oxothiomorpholine-3-carboxamide
- CAS Number: 90243-66-6 62305-91-3
- PubChem CID: 6917793
- DrugBank: DB19762
- ChemSpider: 5293019
- UNII: 30MUJ6YYUY
- KEGG: D02588
- ChEBI: CHEBI:31864

Chemical and physical data
- Formula: C_{17}H_{24}N_{6}O_{4}S
- Molar mass: 408.48 g·mol^{−1}
- 3D model (JSmol): Interactive image
- SMILES: 1S/C17H24N6O4S/c1-9-15(25)22-12(7-28-9)16(26)21-11(5-10-6-19-8-20-10)17(27)23-4-2-3-13(23)14(18)24/h6,8-9,11-13H,2-5,7H2,1H3,(H2,18,24)(H,19,20)(H,21,26)(H,22,25)/t9-,11+,12+,13+/m1/s1
- InChI: InChI=C[C@@H]1C(=O)N[C@@H](CS1)C(=O)N[C@@H](CC2=CN=CN2)C(=O)N3CCC[C@H]3C(=O)N; Key:RSHMQGIMHQPMEB-IXOXFDKPSA-N

Montirelin (also known as CG-3703 or NS-3) is a synthetic analogue of thyrotropin-releasing hormone (TRH), designed to enhance central nervous system stimulation with greater potency and duration than natural TRH.

Montirelin binds to TRH receptors in the brain, stimulating the release of thyrotropin (TSH) and prolactin. It exhibits sustained receptor occupancy and a counter-clockwise hysteresis between plasma concentration and receptor binding, suggesting prolonged CNS activity.

Montirelin has demonstrated efficacy in animal models for:

- Concussion-induced unconsciousness
- Cerebral ischemia
- Memory disruption
- Narcolepsy and cataplexy
- Seizures and spontaneous convulsions
- Spinal trauma

In human studies, a 0.5 mg dose administered over 14 days improved consciousness in 73% of patients with neurological disturbances. Its ability to stimulate cholinergic and noradrenergic systems suggests promise in treating cognitive dysfunction and sleep disorders. Although it the patent, it said that the strength of the medicine was 4mg per tablet, but in contrast to TRH it can be administered orally and is more resistant to metabolic degradation.

== Synthesis ==
Synthesis: Patent (Ex 10): (CD)

The catalytic hydrogenation of (S)-1-N-Cbz-prolinamide [34079-31-7] (1) gives L-Prolinamide [7531-52-4] (2). This is condensed with Z-His-NHNH2 [49706-31-2] (3) in the presence of nitrous acid to give Benzyloxycarbonyl-L-histidyl-L-prolineamide, PC13229382 (4). The protecting group is hydrolyzed in acid to give His-pro-amide [33605-69-5] (5). This is finally condensed with (3R,6R)-6-Methyl-5-oxothiomorpholine-3-carboxylic acid, PC99645792 (6) in the presence of by of 1-hydroxybenzotriazole and dicyclohexylcarbodiimide, completing the synthesis of Montirelin (7).

== Other TRH analogues ==
Analogues of TRH is not just limited to montirelin. Other agents to consider include the following:

1. DN-1417 [77026-80-3]
2. JTP 2942 [148152-77-6]
3. RX-77368 [76820-40-1]
4. Orotirelin [62305-86-6]
