= Safotibant =

Names
- Preferred IUPAC name N-{[4-(4,5-Dihydro-1H-imidazol-2-yl)phenyl]methyl}-2-[2-(4-methoxy-N,2,6-trimethylbenzene-1-sulfonamido)ethoxy]-N-methylacetamide

Identifiers
CAS Number	633698-99-4
3D model (JSmol)	Interactive image
ChemSpider	10127675
PubChem CID	11953367
UNII	02HU8HWP7U
CompTox Dashboard (EPA)	DTXSID20212769
- InChI: InChI=1S/C25H34N4O5S/c1-18-14-22(33-5)15-19(2)24(18)35(31,32)29(4)12-13-34-17-23(30)28(3)16-20-6-8-21(9-7-20)25-26-10-11-27-25/h6-9,14-15H,10-13,16-17H2,1-5H3,(H,26,27) Key: AMTQCENHQIDBHQ-UHFFFAOYSA-N; InChI=1/C25H34N4O5S/c1-18-14-22(33-5)15-19(2)24(18)35(31,32)29(4)12-13-34-17-23(30)28(3)16-20-6-8-21(9-7-20)25-26-10-11-27-25/h6-9,14-15H,10-13,16-17H2,1-5H3,(H,26,27) Key: AMTQCENHQIDBHQ-UHFFFAOYAH
- SMILES: Cc1cc(cc(c1S(=O)(=O)N(C)CCOCC(=O)N(C)Cc2ccc(cc2)C3=NCCN3)C)OC

Properties
Chemical formula	C_{25}H_{34}N_{4}O_{5}S
Molar mass	502.63 g·mol^{−1}
- Except where otherwise noted, data are given for materials in their standard state (at 25 °C [77 °F], 100 kPa). Infobox references

Safotibant (INN) also known by the research code LF22-0542 is a non-peptide bradykinin B_{1} antagonist. It displayed binding Ki values of 0.35 and 6.5 nM at cloned human and mouse B_{1} receptors, respectively, while having no affinity for either human, mouse, or rat B_{2} receptors at concentrations up to 10 μM. This means that LF22-0542 is at least 4000 times selective for the B_{1} receptor over the B_{2} receptor. Systemic administration of LF22-0542 inhibited acute pain induced by acetic acid, formalin, and a hot plate. It also reversed acute inflammatory pain induced by carrageenan, and persistent inflammatory pain induced by CFA. In a neuropathic pain model, LF22-0542 reversed the thermal hyperalgesia, but not the mechanical hyperalgesia.
