= SR-142948 =

Chemical compound

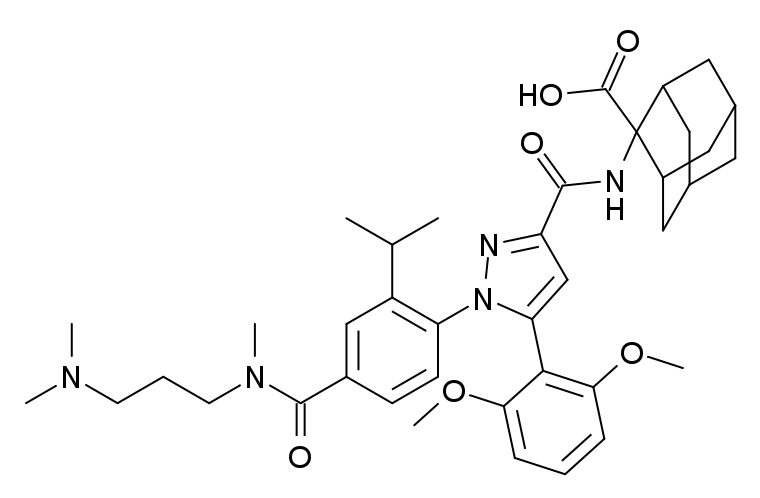

Identifiers
- IUPAC name: 2-([5-(2,6-dimethoxyphenyl)-1-[4-[3-(dimethylamino)propyl-methylcarbamoyl]-2-propan-2-ylphenyl]pyrazole-3-carbonyl]amino)adamantane-2-carboxylic acid
- CAS Number: 184162-64-9
- PubChem CID: 5311451
- IUPHAR/BPS: 1580
- ChemSpider: 4470937
- UNII: W59C8B2MZS
- CompTox Dashboard (EPA): DTXSID50415529

Chemical and physical data
- Formula: C_{39}H_{51}N_{5}O_{6}
- Molar mass: 685.866 g·mol^{−1}
- 3D model (JSmol): Interactive image
- SMILES: O=C(O)C6(NC(=O)c2nn(c1c(cc(C(=O)N(CCCN(C)C)C)cc1)C(C)C)c(c2)c3c(OC)cccc3OC)C4CC5CC6CC(C4)C5
- InChI: InChI=1S/C39H51N5O6/c1-23(2)29-21-26(37(46)43(5)15-9-14-42(3)4)12-13-31(29)44-32(35-33(49-6)10-8-11-34(35)50-7)22-30(41-44)36(45)40-39(38(47)48)27-17-24-16-25(19-27)20-28(39)18-24/h8,10-13,21-25,27-28H,9,14-20H2,1-7H3,(H,40,45)(H,47,48); Key:LWULHXVBLMWCHO-UHFFFAOYSA-N

SR-142948 is a drug used in scientific research which is a non-peptide antagonist selective for the neurotensin receptors, although not selective between subtypes.

== Study ==
SR-142948 has been used to study the role of neurotensin in the regulation of dopamine receptor activity and glutamate signalling in the brain.

In animal studies, SR-142948 blocked the effects of stimulant drugs, including MDMA.
