= BQ-788 =

Names
- Systematic IUPAC name Sodium N-{[(2R,6S)-2,6-dimethyl-1-piperidinyl]carbonyl}-4-methyl-L-leucyl-N-[(1R)-1-carboxylatopentyl]-1-(methoxycarbonyl)-D-tryptophanamide

Identifiers
CAS Number	156161-89-6
3D model (JSmol)	Interactive image
ChemSpider	4470569
PubChem CID	5311031
UNII	44OLL8XEJ4
CompTox Dashboard (EPA)	DTXSID40166053
- InChI: InChI=1S/C34H51N5O7.Na/c1-8-9-16-25(31(42)43)35-29(40)26(18-23-20-38(33(45)46-7)28-17-11-10-15-24(23)28)36-30(41)27(19-34(4,5)6)37-32(44)39-21(2)13-12-14-22(39)3;/h10-11,15,17,20-22,25-27H,8-9,12-14,16,18-19H2,1-7H3,(H,35,40)(H,36,41)(H,37,44)(H,42,43);/q;+1/p-1/t21-,22+,25-,26-,27+;/m1./s1 Key: QCVIFBRTTLMEOV-FUKQNADPSA-M; InChI=1/C34H51N5O7.Na/c1-8-9-16-25(31(42)43)35-29(40)26(18-23-20-38(33(45)46-7)28-17-11-10-15-24(23)28)36-30(41)27(19-34(4,5)6)37-32(44)39-21(2)13-12-14-22(39)3;/h10-11,15,17,20-22,25-27H,8-9,12-14,16,18-19H2,1-7H3,(H,35,40)(H,36,41)(H,37,44)(H,42,43);/q;+1/p-1/t21-,22+,25-,26-,27+;/m1./s1 Key: QCVIFBRTTLMEOV-OZEMXSCFBL
- SMILES: CCCC[C@H](C(=O)[O-])NC(=O)[C@@H](CC1=CN(C2=CC=CC=C21)C(=O)OC)NC(=O)[C@H](CC(C)(C)C)NC(=O)N3[C@@H](CCC[C@@H]3C)C.[Na+]

Properties
Chemical formula	C_{34}H_{50}N_{5}NaO_{7}
Molar mass	663.792 g·mol^{−1}
- Except where otherwise noted, data are given for materials in their standard state (at 25 °C [77 °F], 100 kPa). Infobox references

BQ-788 is a selective ET_{B} antagonist.

== See also ==
- Endothelin
