= Velneperit =

Chemical compound

Clinical data
- ATC code: None

Identifiers
- IUPAC name: trans-4-(tert-butylsulfonylamino)-N-[5-(trifluoromethyl)pyridin-2-yl]cyclohexane-1-carboxamide
- CAS Number: 342577-38-2
- PubChem CID: 20629114
- ChemSpider: 25948511
- UNII: 09BQ2KJ22J
- CompTox Dashboard (EPA): DTXSID20955806

Chemical and physical data
- Formula: C_{17}H_{24}F_{3}N_{3}O_{3}S
- Molar mass: 407.45 g·mol^{−1}
- 3D model (JSmol): Interactive image
- SMILES: CC(C)(C)S(=O)(=O)NC2CCC(CC2)C(=O)Nc1ncc(C(F)(F)F)cc1
- InChI: InChI=1S/C17H24F3N3O3S/c1-16(2,3)27(25,26)23-13-7-4-11(5-8-13)15(24)22-14-9-6-12(10-21-14)17(18,19)20/h6,9-11,13,23H,4-5,7-8H2,1-3H3,(H,21,22,24)/t11-,13-; Key:WGEWUYACXPEFPO-AULYBMBSSA-N

Velneperit (S-2367) is a drug developed by Shionogi, which acts as a potent and selective antagonist for the Neuropeptide Y receptor Y_{5}. It has anorectic effects and was developed as a possible treatment for obesity, but was discontinued from further development after disappointing results in Phase II clinical trials. However it was still considered a successful proof of concept of the potential of Y_{5} receptor antagonists as possible anti-obesity agents in future.
