= Glepaglutide =

Medication

Clinical data
- Trade names: Zeydovio
- Other names: ZP-1848
- Routes of administration: Subcutaneous
- ATC code: None

Legal status
- Legal status: EU: Rx-only

Identifiers
- IUPAC name: (4S)-5-[[2-[[(2S,3R)-1-[[(2S)-1-[[(2S)-1-[[(2S)-1-[[(2S)-1-[[(2S)-1-[[(2S)-1-[[(2S,3R)-1-[[(2S,3S)-1-[[(2S)-1-[[(2S)-1-[[(2S)-1-[[(2S)-1-[[(2S)-1-[[(2S)-1-[[(2S)-1-[[(2S)-1-[[(2S)-1-[[(2S,3S)-1-[[(2S)-1-[[(2S)-1-[[(2S)-1-[[(2S,3S)-1-[[(2S)-1-[[(2S,3R)-1-[[(2S)-6-amino-1-[[(2S,3S)-1-[[(2S,3R)-1-[[(2S)-1-[[(2S)-6-amino-1-[[(2S)-6-amino-1-[[(2S)-6-amino-1-[[(2S)-6-amino-1-[[(2S)-6-amino-1-[[(2S)-1,6-diamino-1-oxohexan-2-yl]amino]-1-oxohexan-2-yl]amino]-1-oxohexan-2-yl]amino]-1-oxohexan-2-yl]amino]-1-oxohexan-2-yl]amino]-1-oxohexan-2-yl]amino]-3-carboxy-1-oxopropan-2-yl]amino]-3-hydroxy-1-oxobutan-2-yl]amino]-3-methyl-1-oxopentan-2-yl]amino]-1-oxohexan-2-yl]amino]-3-hydroxy-1-oxobutan-2-yl]amino]-1-oxopropan-2-yl]amino]-3-methyl-1-oxopentan-2-yl]amino]-4-methyl-1-oxopentan-2-yl]amino]-3-(1H-indol-3-yl)-1-oxopropan-2-yl]amino]-1-oxopropan-2-yl]amino]-3-methyl-1-oxopentan-2-yl]amino]-1-oxo-3-phenylpropan-2-yl]amino]-3-carboxy-1-oxopropan-2-yl]amino]-5-(diaminomethylideneamino)-1-oxopentan-2-yl]amino]-1-oxopropan-2-yl]amino]-1-oxopropan-2-yl]amino]-4-methyl-1-oxopentan-2-yl]amino]-1-oxopropan-2-yl]amino]-3-carboxy-1-oxopropan-2-yl]amino]-4-methyl-1-oxopentan-2-yl]amino]-3-methyl-1-oxopentan-2-yl]amino]-3-hydroxy-1-oxobutan-2-yl]amino]-1-oxopropan-2-yl]amino]-4-methyl-1-oxopentan-2-yl]amino]-4-carboxy-1-oxobutan-2-yl]amino]-3-hydroxy-1-oxopropan-2-yl]amino]-3-hydroxy-1-oxopropan-2-yl]amino]-1-oxo-3-phenylpropan-2-yl]amino]-3-hydroxy-1-oxobutan-2-yl]amino]-2-oxoethyl]amino]-4-[[2-[[(2S)-2-amino-3-(1H-imidazol-4-yl)propanoyl]amino]acetyl]amino]-5-oxopentanoic acid
- CAS Number: 914009-86-2
- PubChem CID: 146170995
- IUPHAR/BPS: 10885
- ChemSpider: 128435307
- UNII: 4M3C1913N6
- KEGG: D11337

Chemical and physical data
- Formula: C_{197}H_{325}N_{53}O_{55}
- Molar mass: 4316.083 g·mol^{−1}
- 3D model (JSmol): Interactive image
- SMILES: CC[C@H](C)[C@@H](C(=O)N[C@@H]([C@@H](C)O)C(=O)N[C@@H](CC(=O)O)C(=O)N[C@@H](CCCCN)C(=O)N[C@@H](CCCCN)C(=O)N[C@@H](CCCCN)C(=O)N[C@@H](CCCCN)C(=O)N[C@@H](CCCCN)C(=O)N[C@@H](CCCCN)C(=O)N)NC(=O)[C@H](CCCCN)NC(=O)[C@H]([C@@H](C)O)NC(=O)[C@H](C)NC(=O)[C@H]([C@@H](C)CC)NC(=O)[C@H](CC(C)C)NC(=O)[C@H](CC1=CNC2=CC=CC=C21)NC(=O)[C@H](C)NC(=O)[C@H]([C@@H](C)CC)NC(=O)[C@H](CC3=CC=CC=C3)NC(=O)[C@H](CC(=O)O)NC(=O)[C@H](CCCN=C(N)N)NC(=O)[C@H](C)NC(=O)[C@H](C)NC(=O)[C@H](CC(C)C)NC(=O)[C@H](C)NC(=O)[C@H](CC(=O)O)NC(=O)[C@H](CC(C)C)NC(=O)[C@H]([C@@H](C)CC)NC(=O)[C@H]([C@@H](C)O)NC(=O)[C@H](C)NC(=O)[C@H](CC(C)C)NC(=O)[C@H](CCC(=O)O)NC(=O)[C@H](CO)NC(=O)[C@H](CO)NC(=O)[C@H](CC4=CC=CC=C4)NC(=O)[C@H]([C@@H](C)O)NC(=O)CNC(=O)[C@H](CCC(=O)O)NC(=O)CNC(=O)[C@H](CC5=CNC=N5)N
- InChI: InChI=InChI=1S/C197H325N53O55/c1-27-102(13)152(190(299)220-111(22)166(275)248-157(113(24)254)194(303)230-129(66-45-52-78-204)176(285)244-155(105(16)30-4)192(301)250-158(114(25)255)195(304)240-142(90-151(267)268)183(292)228-128(65-44-51-77-203)173(282)227-127(64-43-50-76-202)172(281)226-126(63-42-49-75-201)171(280)225-125(62-41-48-74-200)170(279)224-124(61-40-47-73-199)169(278)222-123(160(206)269)60-39-46-72-198)245-185(294)136(83-101(11)12)234-182(291)139(86-118-91-211-122-59-38-37-58-120(118)122)232-164(273)109(20)219-189(298)153(103(14)28-2)246-186(295)138(85-117-56-35-32-36-57-117)235-184(293)141(89-150(265)266)236-174(283)130(67-53-79-210-197(207)208)223-162(271)107(18)215-161(270)106(17)216-177(286)133(80-98(5)6)231-163(272)108(19)217-179(288)140(88-149(263)264)237-180(289)135(82-100(9)10)238-191(300)154(104(15)29-3)247-196(305)159(115(26)256)249-165(274)110(21)218-178(287)134(81-99(7)8)233-175(284)132(69-71-148(261)262)229-187(296)143(95-251)242-188(297)144(96-252)241-181(290)137(84-116-54-33-31-34-55-116)239-193(302)156(112(23)253)243-146(258)94-213-168(277)131(68-70-147(259)260)221-145(257)93-212-167(276)121(205)87-119-92-209-97-214-119/h31-38,54-59,91-92,97-115,121,123-144,152-159,211,251-256H,27-30,39-53,60-90,93-96,198-205H2,1-26H3,(H2,206,269)(H,209,214)(H,212,276)(H,213,277)(H,215,270)(H,216,286)(H,217,288)(H,218,287)(H,219,298)(H,220,299)(H,221,257)(H,222,278)(H,223,271)(H,224,279)(H,225,280)(H,226,281)(H,227,282)(H,228,292)(H,229,296)(H,230,303)(H,231,272)(H,232,273)(H,233,284)(H,234,291)(H,235,293)(H,236,283)(H,237,289)(H,238,300)(H,239,302)(H,240,304)(H,241,290)(H,242,297)(H,243,258)(H,244,285)(H,245,294)(H,246,295)(H,247,305)(H,248,275)(H,249,274)(H,250,301)(H,259,260)(H,261,262)(H,263,264)(H,265,266)(H,267,268)(H4,207,208,210)/t102-,103-,104-,105-,106-,107-,108-,109-,110-,111-,112+,113+,114+,115+,121-,123-,124-,125-,126-,127-,128-,129-,130-,131-,132-,133-,134-,135-,136-,137-,138-,139-,140-,141-,142-,143-,144-,152-,153-,154-,155-,156-,157-,158-,159-/m0/s1; Key:DOAUQKRTILFGHV-PDCMDPCFSA-N

Glepaglutide, sold under the brand name Zeydovio, is a medication used for the treatment of short bowel syndrome. It is given by injection under the skin.

Glepaglutide was authorized for medical use in the European Union in November 2026.

== Medical uses ==
Glepaglutide is indicated for the treatment of adults with short bowel syndrome.

Glepaglutide is a synthetic, long-acting, 39-amino-acid analog of human glucagon-like peptide-2 (GLP-2). Its structure consists of the 33-residue GLP-2 backbone with nine amino-acid substitutions and a six-lysine C-terminal extension, with the terminal lysine amidated. These modifications increases its duration of action.

Glepaglutide acts as a GLP-2 receptor agonist, mimicking the intestinal growth-promoting effects of endogenous GLP-2 which is its therapeutic rationale for its development for treating short bowel syndrome.

== Society and culture ==
=== Legal status ===
In September 2026, the Committee for Medicinal Products for Human Use of the European Medicines Agency adopted a positive opinion, recommending the granting of a marketing authorization for the medicinal product Zeydovio, intended for the treatment of short bowel syndrome. The applicant for this medicinal product is Zealand Pharma. Glepaglutide was authorized for medical use in the European Union in November 2026.

=== Names ===
Glepaglutide is the international nonproprietary name.

Glepaglutide is sold under the brand name Zeydovio.
