= Oxyntomodulin =

Names
- IUPAC name L-histidyl-L-seryl-L-glutaminylglycyl-L-threonyl-L-phenylalanyl-L-threonyl-L-seryl-L-α-aspartyl-L-tyrosyl-L-seryl-L-lysyl-L-tyrosyl-L-leucyl-L-α-aspartyl-L-seryl-L-arginyl-L-arginyl-L-alanyl-L-glutaminyl-L-α-aspartyl-L-phenylalanyl-L-valyl-L-glutaminyl-L-tryptophyl-L-leucyl-L-methionyl-L-α-aspartyl-L-threonyl-L-lysyl-L-arginyl-L-asparaginyl-L-lysyl-L-asparaginyl-L-asparaginyl-L-isoleucyl-L-alanine
- Other names OXM

Identifiers
CAS Number	502771-49-5
3D model (JSmol)	Interactive image
ChemSpider	Porcine: 17300512
PubChem CID	Porcine: 90488738; 121494088
- InChI: InChI=1S/C192H294N58O61S/c1-15-93(8)150(185(306)217-95(10)189(310)311)248-178(299)129(77-143(202)265)236-172(293)128(76-142(201)264)235-161(282)110(39-24-27-60-193)221-171(292)127(75-141(200)263)234-162(283)115(44-32-65-212-192(207)208)220-158(279)112(41-26-29-62-195)226-187(308)152(97(12)256)250-179(300)133(81-148(273)274)238-165(286)119(59-66-312-14)225-166(287)120(67-90(2)3)229-170(291)126(73-103-82-213-109-38-23-22-37-107(103)109)233-164(285)118(55-58-140(199)262)227-184(305)149(92(6)7)247-176(297)124(69-99-33-18-16-19-34-99)232-173(294)130(78-145(267)268)237-163(284)117(54-57-139(198)261)218-154(275)94(9)216-157(278)113(42-30-63-210-190(203)204)219-159(280)114(43-31-64-211-191(205)206)223-182(303)136(87-253)244-175(296)132(80-147(271)272)239-167(288)121(68-91(4)5)228-168(289)122(71-101-45-49-105(258)50-46-101)230-160(281)111(40-25-28-61-194)222-181(302)135(86-252)243-169(290)123(72-102-47-51-106(259)52-48-102)231-174(295)131(79-146(269)270)240-183(304)137(88-254)245-188(309)153(98(13)257)249-177(298)125(70-100-35-20-17-21-36-100)241-186(307)151(96(11)255)246-144(266)84-214-156(277)116(53-56-138(197)260)224-180(301)134(85-251)242-155(276)108(196)74-104-83-209-89-215-104/h16-23,33-38,45-52,82-83,89-98,108,110-137,149-153,213,251-259H,15,24-32,39-44,53-81,84-88,193-196H2,1-14H3,(H2,197,260)(H2,198,261)(H2,199,262)(H2,200,263)(H2,201,264)(H2,202,265)(H,209,215)(H,214,277)(H,216,278)(H,217,306)(H,218,275)(H,219,280)(H,220,279)(H,221,292)(H,222,302)(H,223,303)(H,224,301)(H,225,287)(H,226,308)(H,227,305)(H,228,289)(H,229,291)(H,230,281)(H,231,295)(H,232,294)(H,233,285)(H,234,283)(H,235,282)(H,236,293)(H,237,284)(H,238,286)(H,239,288)(H,240,304)(H,241,307)(H,242,276)(H,243,290)(H,244,296)(H,245,309)(H,246,266)(H,247,297)(H,248,299)(H,249,298)(H,250,300)(H,267,268)(H,269,270)(H,271,272)(H,273,274)(H,310,311)(H4,203,204,210)(H4,205,206,211)(H4,207,208,212)/t93-,94-,95-,96+,97+,98+,108-,110-,111-,112-,113-,114-,115-,116-,117-,118-,119-,120-,121-,122-,123-,124-,125-,126-,127-,128-,129-,130-,131-,132-,133-,134-,135-,136-,137-,149-,150-,151-,152-,153-/m0/s1 Key: BGXWJAWHUWPRAD-DPNMSELWSA-N
- SMILES: N[C@@]([H])(CC1=CN=C-N1)C(=O)N[C@@]([H])(CO)C(=O)N[C@@]([H])(CCC(=O)N)C(=O)NCC(=O)N[C@@]([H])([C@]([H])(O)C)C(=O)N[C@@]([H])(Cc1ccccc1)C(=O)N[C@@]([H])([C@]([H])(O)C)C(=O)N[C@@]([H])(CO)C(=O)N[C@@]([H])(CC(=O)O)C(=O)N[C@@]([H])(Cc1ccc(O)cc1)C(=O)N[C@@]([H])(CO)C(=O)N[C@@]([H])(CCCCN)C(=O)N[C@@]([H])(Cc1ccc(O)cc1)C(=O)N[C@@]([H])(CC(C)C)C(=O)N[C@@]([H])(CC(=O)O)C(=O)N[C@@]([H])(CO)C(=O)N[C@@]([H])(CCCNC(=N)N)C(=O)N[C@@]([H])(CCCNC(=N)N)C(=O)N[C@@]([H])(C)C(=O)N[C@@]([H])(CCC(=O)N)C(=O)N[C@@]([H])(CC(=O)O)C(=O)N[C@@]([H])(Cc1ccccc1)C(=O)N[C@@]([H])(C(C)C)C(=O)N[C@@]([H])(CCC(=O)N)C(=O)N[C@@]([H])(CC(=CN2)C1=C2C=CC=C1)C(=O)N[C@@]([H])(CC(C)C)C(=O)N[C@@]([H])(CCSC)C(=O)N[C@@]([H])(CC(=O)O)C(=O)N[C@@]([H])([C@]([H])(O)C)C(=O)N[C@@]([H])(CCCCN)C(=O)N[C@@]([H])(CCCNC(=N)N)C(=O)N[C@@]([H])(CC(=O)N)C(=O)N[C@@]([H])(CCCCN)C(=O)N[C@@]([H])(CC(=O)N)C(=O)N[C@@]([H])(CC(=O)N)C(=O)N[C@@]([H])([C@]([H])(CC)C)C(=O)N[C@@]([H])(C)C(=O)O

Properties
Chemical formula	C_{192}H_{294}N_{58}O_{61}S
Molar mass	4422.87 g·mol^{−1}
- Except where otherwise noted, data are given for materials in their standard state (at 25 °C [77 °F], 100 kPa). Infobox references

Oxyntomodulin (often abbreviated OXM) is a naturally occurring 37-amino acid peptide hormone found in the colon, produced by the oxyntic (fundic) cells of the oxyntic (fundic) mucosa. It has been found to suppress appetite.

The mechanism of action of oxyntomodulin is not well understood. It is known to bind both the GLP-1 receptor and the glucagon receptor, but it is not known whether the effects of the hormone are mediated through these receptors or through an unidentified receptor.

Oxyntomodulin has been linked to entrainment of the liver's circadian clock.

Oxyntomodulin has been investigated as a blood-glucose regulation agent in connection with diabetes.

== Research ==
Oxyntomodulin could be a potential candidate for treating obesity because of its ability to suppress appetite. In a 4 week study, healthy overweight and obese volunteers were given either saline or oxyntomodulin injections. Their body weight, energy intake, and the levels of adipose hormones were taken prior to the treatment. The volunteers maintained their usual diets and daily activities and self-administered the injections three times daily, 30 minutes before their meals. In the course of 4 weeks, volunteers treated with oxyntomodulin injections had an average weight loss of 2.3±0.4 kg compared to those treated with saline who had an average of 0.5±0.5 kg, indicating oxyntomodulin was successful in weight loss.
