= Chaetochromin =

Chemical compound

Chaetochromin A

Clinical data
- Other names: 4548-G05; Chaetochromin A

Identifiers
- IUPAC name: 5,5',6,6',8,8'-Hexahydroxy-2,2',3,3'-tetramethyl-2,2',3,3'-tetrahydro-4H,4'H-9,9'-bibenzo[g]chromene-4,4'-dione
- CAS Number: 75514-37-3
- PubChem CID: 6712966
- ChemSpider: 5144991
- UNII: YME4GS90I1
- ChEMBL: ChEMBL162783
- CompTox Dashboard (EPA): DTXSID501337172 DTXSID10910964, DTXSID501337172

Chemical and physical data
- Formula: C_{30}H_{26}O_{10}
- Molar mass: 546.528 g·mol^{−1}
- 3D model (JSmol): Interactive image
- SMILES: C[C@@H]1[C@H](OC2=C(C1=O)C(=C3C(=C2)C(=C(C=C3O)O)C4=C(C=C(C5=C(C6=C(C=C54)O[C@@H]([C@H](C6=O)C)C)O)O)O)O)C
- InChI: InChI=1S/C30H26O10/c1-9-11(3)39-19-5-13-21(15(31)7-17(33)23(13)29(37)25(19)27(9)35)22-14-6-20-26(28(36)10(2)12(4)40-20)30(38)24(14)18(34)8-16(22)32/h5-12,31-34,37-38H,1-4H3/t9-,10-,11-,12-/m1/s1; Key:RHNVLFNWDGWACV-DDHJBXDOSA-N

Chaetochromin, also known as 4548-G05, is an orally active, small-molecule, selective agonist of the insulin receptor. It has potent and long-lasting antidiabetic activity in vivo in mice. The drug may represent a novel potential therapeutic agent for the treatment of diabetes which is more convenient and tolerable to administer than injected insulin. It was discovered in 1981 in Chaetomium gracile fungi, and its interaction with the insulin receptor was identified in 2014.

== Stereochemistry ==
Chaetochromin A and B are stereoisomers of this structure, while chaetochromin C and D are related but different compounds. It is not known whether the insulin mimetic effect was found in chaetochromin A or B, or in a mixture.

== See also ==
- Anti-diabetic medication
