= COPA (gene) =

Protein-coding gene in humans

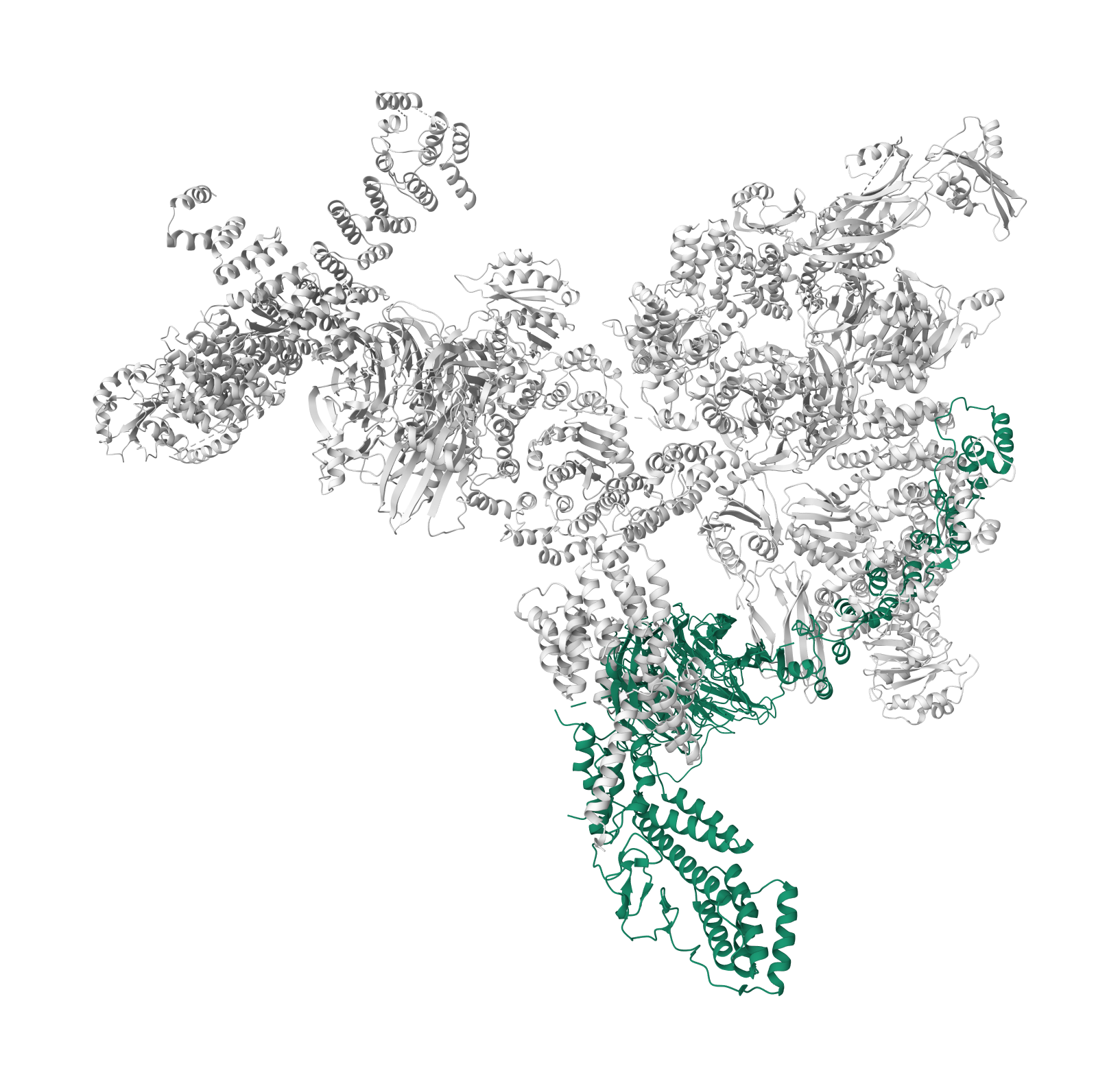

Identifiers
- Aliases: COPA, HEP-COP, AILJK, coatomer protein complex subunit alpha, alpha-COP, COPI coat complex subunit alpha
- External IDs: OMIM: 601924; MGI: 1334462; GeneCards: COPA
Available structures
PDB	Ortholog search: PDBe RCSB
PDB	List of PDB id codes 5A1U, 5A1V, 5A1W, 5A1X, 5A1Y

Gene location (Mouse)
Chr.	Chromosome 1 (mouse)
Band	1 H3|1 79.54 cM	Start	171,910,096 bp
Band	1 H3|1 79.54 cM	End	171,949,897 bp
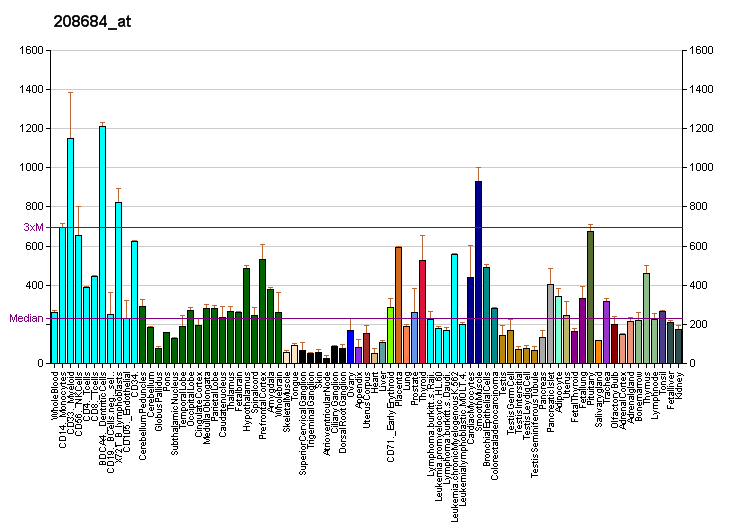

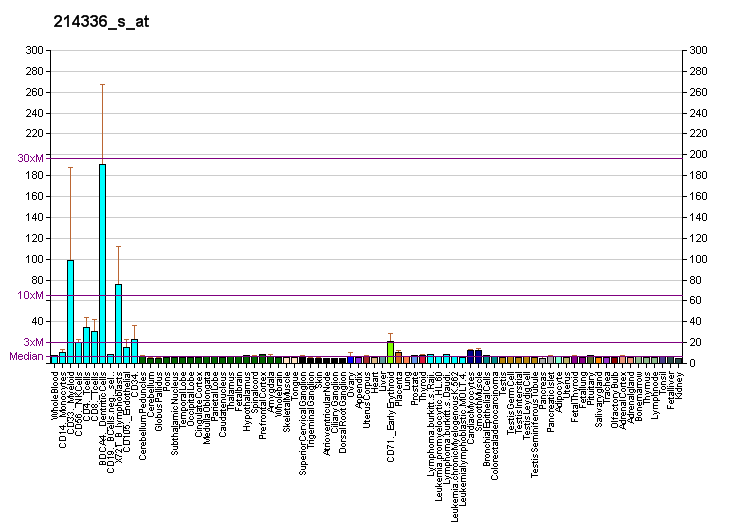
RNA expression pattern
Bgee	Human / Mouse (ortholog); Top expressed in: stromal cell of endometrium; islet of Langerhans; pituitary gland; ganglionic eminence; anterior pituitary; inferior ganglion of vagus nerve; corpus callosum; smooth muscle tissue; pylorus; cardia / Top expressed in: calvaria; molar; ascending aorta; dermis; aortic valve; parotid gland; stroma of bone marrow; genital tubercle; lacrimal gland; foot; More reference expression data
BioGPS	More reference expression data
Gene ontology
Molecular function	hormone activity; structural molecule activity
Cellular component	cytoplasm; cytosol; Golgi apparatus; membrane; Golgi membrane; COPI-coated vesicle membrane; transport vesicle; extracellular region; membrane coat; COPI vesicle coat; extracellular exosome; cytoplasmic vesicle; endoplasmic reticulum membrane; extracellular space
Biological process	retrograde vesicle-mediated transport, Golgi to endoplasmic reticulum; pancreatic juice secretion; endoplasmic reticulum to Golgi vesicle-mediated transport; protein transport; intracellular protein transport; intra-Golgi vesicle-mediated transport; vesicle-mediated transport; transport; regulation of signaling receptor activity; signal transduction
Sources:Amigo / QuickGO
Orthologs
Databases	NCBI: entry
Species	Human	Mouse
Entrez	1314	12847
Ensembl	n/a	ENSMUSG00000026553
UniProt	P53621	Q8CIE6
RefSeq (mRNA)	NM_004371; NM_001098398	NM_009938
RefSeq (protein)	NP_001091868; NP_004362	NP_034068
Location (UCSC)	n/a	Chr 1: 171.91 – 171.95 Mb
PubMed search
- Wikidata
View/Edit Human	View/Edit Mouse

Coatomer subunit alpha is a protein that in humans is encoded by the COPA gene.

== Function ==
In eukaryotic cells, protein transport between the endoplasmic reticulum and Golgi compartments is mediated in part by non-clathrin-coated vesicular coat proteins (COPs). Seven coat proteins have been identified, and they represent subunits of a complex known as coatomer. The subunits are designated alpha-COP, beta-COP, beta-prime-COP, gamma-COP, delta-COP, epsilon-COP, and zeta-COP. The alpha-COP, encoded by COPA, shares high sequence similarity with RET1, the homologous alpha subunit of the coatomer complex in yeast. Also, the N-terminal 25 amino acids of alpha-COP encode the bioactive peptide, xenin, which stimulates exocrine pancreatic secretion and may act as a gastrointestinal hormone. Alternative splicing results in multiple splice forms encoding distinct isoforms.

== Interactions ==
COPA (gene) has been shown to interact with COPE and COPB1.
