= Xenin =

Coatomer subunit alpha

Identifiers
- Symbol: COPA
- RefSeq: NP_001091868
- UniProt: P53621

Other data
- Locus: Chr. 1 q23.2
Search for
- Structures: Swiss-model
- Domains: InterPro

Xenin is a peptide hormone secreted from the chromogranin A-positive enteroendocrine cells called the K-cells in the mucous membrane of the duodenum and stomach of the upper gut. The peptide has been found in humans, dogs, pigs, rats, and rabbits.

In humans, xenin circulates in the blood plasma. There is a relationship between peaks of xenin concentration in the plasma and the third phase of the Migrating Motor Complex. For example, infusion of synthetic xenin in fasting volunteers will cause phase III activity. After a meal (the 'postprandial state'), infusion of xenin increases both frequency and the percentage of aborally propagated contractions. In higher concentrations xenin stimulates exocrine pancreatic secretion and inhibits the gastrin-stimulated secretion of acid in dogs. Xenin is also produced in neuroendocrine tumors of the duodenal mucosa.

In vitro, xenin interacts with the neurotensin receptor 1.

== Structure and sequence ==
Xenin is a 25-amino acid polypeptide. The amino acid sequence of xenin is identical to the N-terminal end of cytoplasmic coatomer subunit alpha, from which xenin can be cleaved by aspartic proteases. Xenin is structurally related to the amphibian peptide xenopsin and to the neuropeptide neurotensin.

Surpassed by insulin, xenin reflects the second highest degree of homology traced along the evolutionary tree among the regulatory peptides, indicating its prominent structural conservatism.

== Proxenin ==
Proxenin is the precursor to xenin. It is a 35-amino acid polypeptide. Like xenin, its amino acid sequence exactly matches the N-terminus of coatomer subunit alpha.

== As a drug target ==
Xenin promotes beta-cell survival and xenin has been evaluated in animal models of obesity and diabetes where it has demonstrated an antidiabetic potential. In humans, co-administration of xenin-25 and gastric inhibitory polypeptide (GIP) reduces postprandial glycemia by delaying gastric emptying.
