= Copa =

Copa or COPA may refer to:

== COPA ==
COPA may refer to:

- Child Online Protection Act, a former U.S. law to protect minors from certain material on the internet
- Canadian Owners and Pilots Association
- Cirrus Owners and Pilots Association
- Parliamentary Conference of the Americas
- COPA (gene), a human gene that encodes the coatomer subunit alpha protein
- Controlling Profitability Analysis, Profitability Analysis (SAP)
- COPA-COGECA, a union of European farmers
- Civilian Office of Police Accountability

== Copa ==
Copa may refer to:

- Copa, medieval name of Slavyansk-on-Kuban
- Principality of Copa, a historical principality
- Copa Airlines, an international airline based in Panama
- Copa America, the main association football competition of the South American men's national football teams
- Copa (spider), a genus of spiders in the family Corinnidae
- Copacabana (nightclub), a nightclub in New York City
- Copa Room, now-defunct Las Vegas nightclub at The Sands Hotel
- CoPa, a short-lived nickname for Comerica Park in Detroit
- Boubacar Barry, Ivorian footballer
- Copa (mountain), a peak in the Cordillera Blanca mountain range of the Peruvian Andes

== See also ==
- COPAA
- COPPA
