= Neurotensin receptor =

Family of proteins

Neurotensin receptor 1 (high affinity)
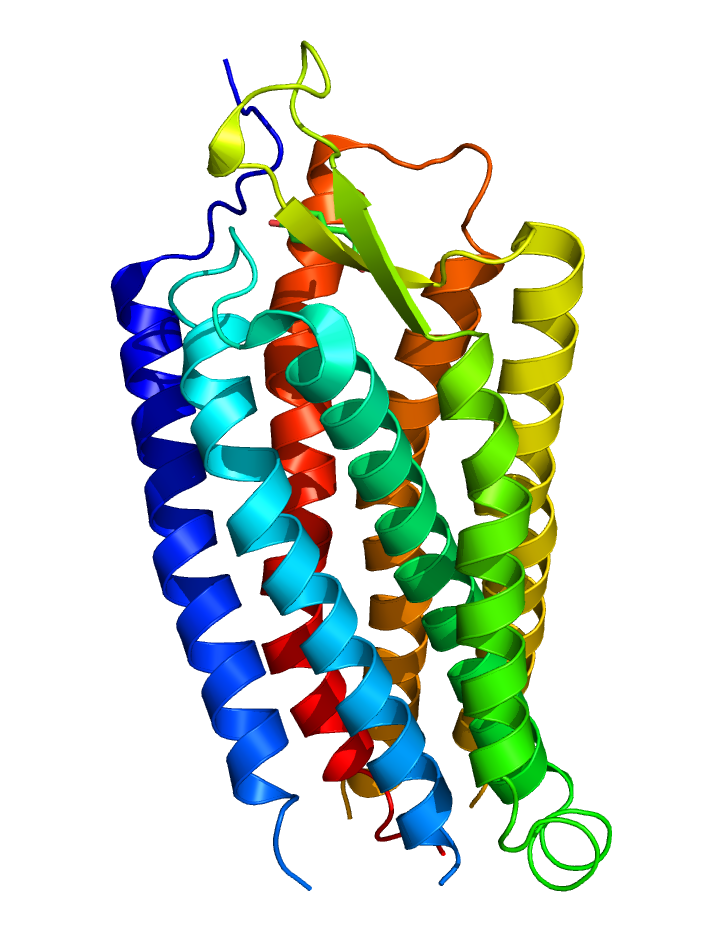
- 3D structure model of the neurotensin receptor NTS1 in complex with NTS(8-13) based on PDB 4GRV

Identifiers
- Symbol: NTSR1
- Alt. symbols: NTR
- NCBI gene: 4923
- HGNC: 8039
- OMIM: 162651
- RefSeq: NM_002531
- UniProt: P30989

Other data
- Locus: Chr. 20 q13-20q13
Search for
- Structures: Swiss-model
- Domains: InterPro

Neurotensin receptor 2

Identifiers
- Symbol: NTSR2
- Alt. symbols: NTR2
- NCBI gene: 23620
- HGNC: 8040
- OMIM: 605538
- RefSeq: NM_012344
- UniProt: O95665

Other data
- Locus: Chr. 2 p25.1
Search for
- Structures: Swiss-model
- Domains: InterPro

Sortilin 1

Identifiers
- Symbol: SORT1
- Alt. symbols: Gp95, NT3
- NCBI gene: 6272
- HGNC: 11186
- OMIM: 602458
- RefSeq: NM_002959
- UniProt: Q99523

Other data
- Locus: Chr. 1 p21.3-1p13.1
Search for
- Structures: Swiss-model
- Domains: InterPro

Neurotensin receptors are transmembrane receptors that bind the neurotransmitter neurotensin. Two of the receptors encoded by the NTSR1 and NTSR2 genes are G protein-coupled receptors, while the third receptor, called NTS_{3} or Sortilin, is a single transmembrane domain receptor encoded by the gene SORT1. It is a multi-functional protein which also participates in protein sorting. NTSR1’s function is mediated by its binding to Gq alpha subunit family G-proteins, while NTSR2’s signaling pathway is not yet fully understood.

== Ligands ==
=== Agonists ===
Peptide

- Beta-lactotensin (NTS_{2})
- JMV-449
- Neurotensin
- Neuromedin N (NTS_{1} selective)
- PD-149,163 (NTS_{1} selective, reduced amide bond 8-13 fragment of neurotensin)

Non-peptide

- NTS_{1} full agonist SRI-9829
- Partial agonists derived from SR-48692

=== Antagonists ===
- Levocabastine (NTS_{2} selective, also H_{1} histamine antagonist)
- SR-48692 (NTS_{1} selective)
- SR-142948 (unselective, CAS# 184162-64-9)

== Biophysical investigation ==
Unusually for GPCRs, NTS1 can be expressed in an active form in the bacteria E. coli. It can be purified and analysed in vitro and has been analysed by a number of biophysical techniques such as surface plasmon resonance, FRET and cryo-electron microscopy. Furthermore, high-resolution crystal structures of NTS_{1} have been determined in complex with the peptide full agonist NT8-13, the non-peptide full agonist SRI-9829, the partial agonist RTI-3a, and the antagonists / inverse agonists SR-48692 and SR-142948, as well as in the ligand-free apo state
