= Neurotensin receptor 2 =

Protein found in humans

NTSR2

Identifiers
- Aliases: NTSR2, NTR2, Neurotensin receptor 2
- External IDs: OMIM: 605538; MGI: 108018; GeneCards: NTSR2

Gene location (Human)
Chr.	Chromosome 2 (human)
Band	2p25.1	Start	11,658,178 bp
Band	2p25.1	End	11,670,195 bp

Gene location (Mouse)
Chr.	Chromosome 12 (mouse)
Band	12 A1.1|12 7.98 cM	Start	16,703,383 bp
Band	12 A1.1|12 7.98 cM	End	16,710,228 bp
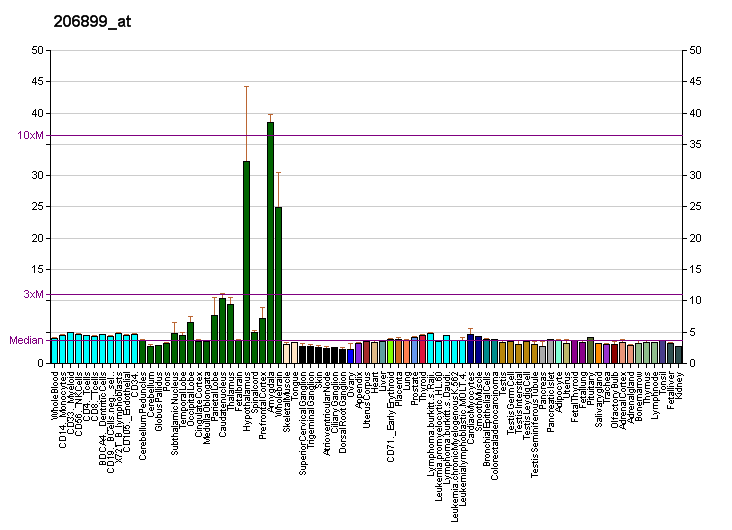
RNA expression pattern
Bgee	Human / Mouse (ortholog); Top expressed in: nucleus accumbens; caudate nucleus; putamen; amygdala; substantia nigra; hypothalamus; testicle; anterior cingulate cortex; right frontal lobe; external globus pallidus / Top expressed in: globus pallidus; superior colliculus; deep cerebellar nuclei; central gray substance of midbrain; dorsomedial hypothalamic nucleus; dorsal tegmental nucleus; medulla oblongata; mammillary body; inferior colliculi; lateral hypothalamus; More reference expression data
BioGPS	More reference expression data
Gene ontology
Molecular function	G protein-coupled receptor activity; G protein-coupled neurotensin receptor activity; signal transducer activity
Cellular component	integral component of membrane; plasma membrane; integral component of plasma membrane; membrane
Biological process	regulation of membrane potential; phospholipase C-activating G protein-coupled receptor signaling pathway; cell surface receptor signaling pathway; neuropeptide signaling pathway; sensory perception; signal transduction; G protein-coupled receptor signaling pathway
Sources:Amigo / QuickGO
Orthologs
Databases	NCBI: entry; OMA: entry
Species	Human	Mouse
Entrez	23620	18217
Ensembl	ENSG00000169006	ENSMUSG00000020591
UniProt	O95665	P70310
RefSeq (mRNA)	NM_012344	NM_008747; NM_001361702; NM_001361703
RefSeq (protein)	NP_036476	NP_032773; NP_001348631; NP_001348632
Location (UCSC)	Chr 2: 11.66 – 11.67 Mb	Chr 12: 16.7 – 16.71 Mb
PubMed search
- Wikidata
View/Edit Human	View/Edit Mouse

Neurotensin receptor type 2 is a protein that in humans is encoded by the NTSR2 gene.

== Function ==
The protein encoded by this gene belongs to the G protein-coupled receptor family that activates a phosphatidylinositol-calcium second messenger system. Binding and pharmacological studies demonstrate that this receptor binds Neurotensin (NT) as well as several other ligands already described for Neurotensin receptor 1. NT function is known to be a neuromodulator of dopamine and has hypothermic and analgesic properties in the brain and some peripheral organ function as well. NTS2 is found mostly in the brain through Northern-blot analysis. Unlike NTS1, NTS2 has a low affinity with NT and a high sensitivity to levocabastine, an antihistamine, which competes with NT for binding.

== See also ==
- Neurotensin receptor
