= Sortilin =

Protein found in humans

SORT1
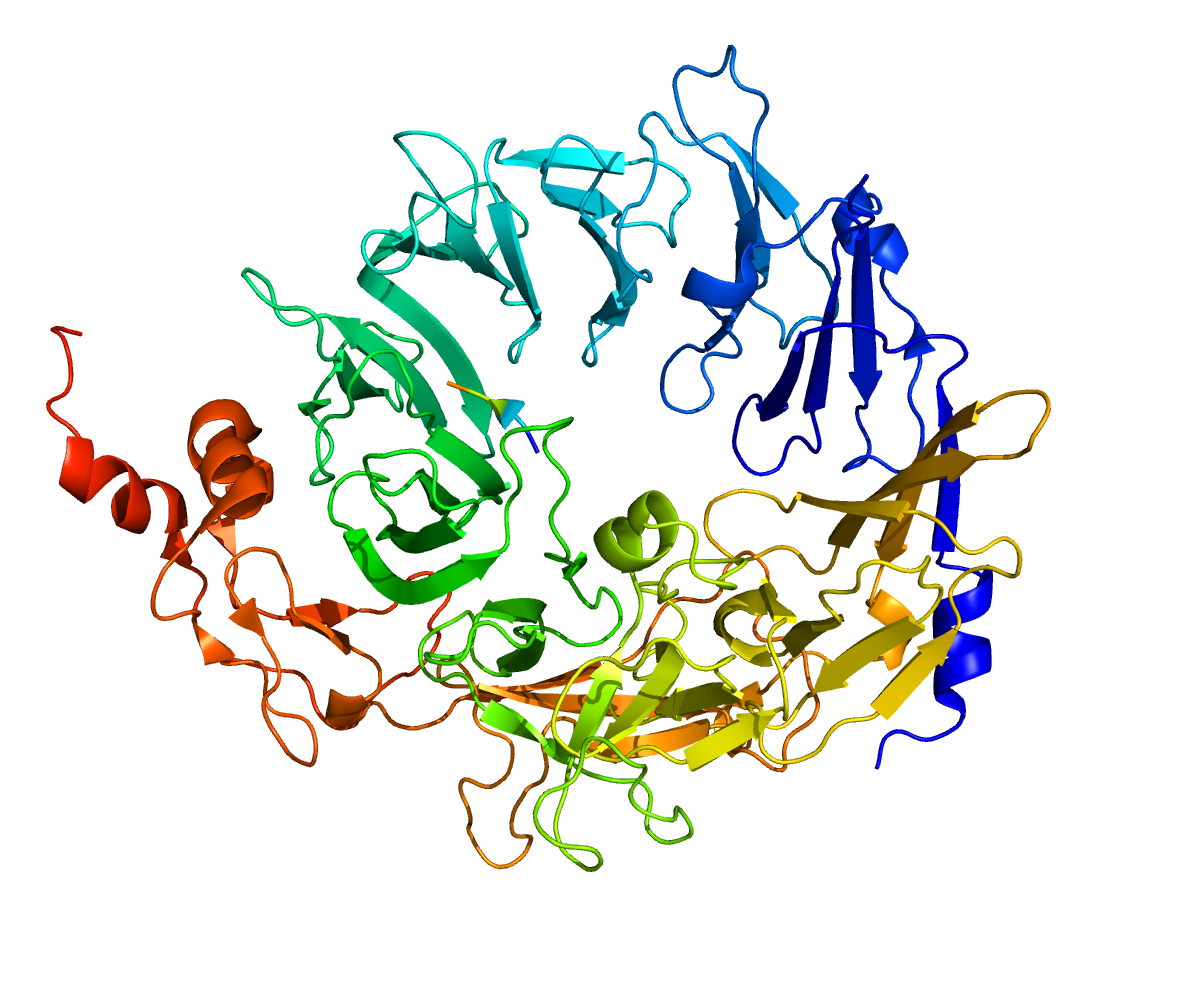

Identifiers
- Aliases: SORT1, Gp95, LDLCQ6, NT3, NTR3, Sortilin 1
- External IDs: OMIM: 602458; MGI: 1338015; GeneCards: SORT1
Available structures
PDB	Ortholog search: PDBe RCSB
PDB	List of PDB id codes 3F6K, 3G2U, 3G2V, 4MSL, 4N7E, 4PO7

Gene location (Human)
Chr.	Chromosome 1 (human)
Band	1p13.3|1p21.3-p13.1	Start	109,309,568 bp
Band	1p13.3|1p21.3-p13.1	End	109,397,918 bp

Gene location (Mouse)
Chr.	Chromosome 3 (mouse)
Band	3|3 F3	Start	108,191,398 bp
Band	3|3 F3	End	108,268,827 bp
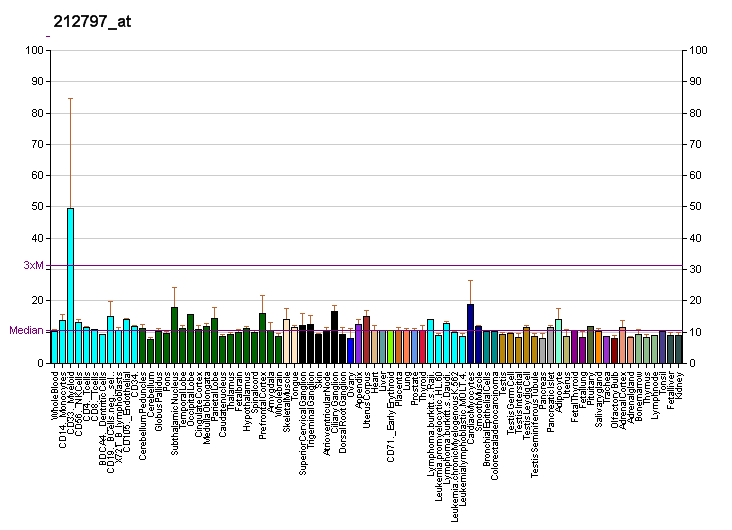

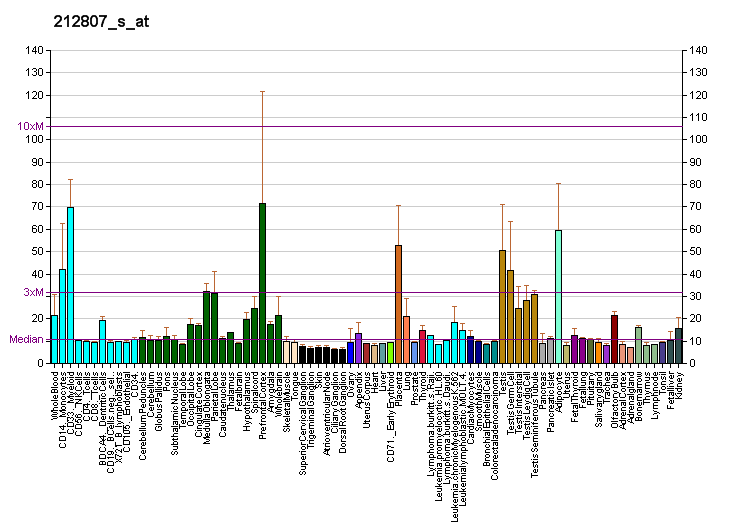
RNA expression pattern
Bgee	Human / Mouse (ortholog); Top expressed in: inferior ganglion of vagus nerve; corpus epididymis; subthalamic nucleus; postcentral gyrus; globus pallidus; external globus pallidus; internal globus pallidus; pars reticulata; corpus callosum; superior vestibular nucleus / Top expressed in: dentate gyrus of hippocampal formation granule cell; superior frontal gyrus; primary visual cortex; ascending aorta; granulocyte; muscle of thigh; lumbar subsegment of spinal cord; aortic valve; spermatid; neural layer of retina; More reference expression data
BioGPS	More reference expression data
Gene ontology
Molecular function	nerve growth factor receptor activity; neurotensin receptor activity, non-G protein-coupled; nerve growth factor binding; protein binding; enzyme binding
Cellular component	integral component of membrane; endosome; Golgi apparatus; nuclear membrane; endoplasmic reticulum membrane; membrane; intracellular membrane-bounded organelle; plasma membrane; Golgi cisterna membrane; cell surface; lysosomal membrane; soma; dendrite; early endosome; endoplasmic reticulum; perinuclear region of cytoplasm; clathrin-coated pit; trans-Golgi network transport vesicle; lysosome; endosome membrane; clathrin-coated vesicle; nucleus; cytosol; cytoplasmic vesicle membrane; cytoplasmic vesicle
Biological process	G protein-coupled receptor signaling pathway; cell differentiation; myotube differentiation; negative regulation of fat cell differentiation; endocytosis; neurotrophin TRK receptor signaling pathway; ossification; endosome transport via multivesicular body sorting pathway; vesicle organization; endosome to lysosome transport; Golgi to endosome transport; positive regulation of epithelial cell apoptotic process; multicellular organism development; response to insulin; plasma membrane to endosome transport; regulation of gene expression; negative regulation of lipoprotein lipase activity; glucose import; neuropeptide signaling pathway; extrinsic apoptotic signaling pathway via death domain receptors; nerve growth factor signaling pathway; post-Golgi vesicle-mediated transport
Sources:Amigo / QuickGO
Orthologs
Databases	NCBI: entry; OMA: entry
Species	Human	Mouse
Entrez	6272	20661
Ensembl	ENSG00000134243	ENSMUSG00000068747
UniProt	Q99523	Q6PHU5
RefSeq (mRNA)	NM_001205228; NM_002959	NM_001271599; NM_019972
RefSeq (protein)	NP_001192157; NP_002950	NP_001258528; NP_064356
Location (UCSC)	Chr 1: 109.31 – 109.4 Mb	Chr 3: 108.19 – 108.27 Mb
PubMed search
- Wikidata
View/Edit Human	View/Edit Mouse

Sortilin is a protein that in humans is encoded by the SORT1 gene on chromosome 1. This protein is a type I membrane glycoprotein in the vacuolar protein sorting 10 protein (Vps10p) family of sorting receptors. While it is ubiquitously expressed in many tissues, sortilin is most abundant in the central nervous system. At the cellular level, sortilin functions in protein transport between the Golgi apparatus, endosome, lysosome, and plasma membrane, leading to its involvement in multiple biological processes such as glucose and lipid metabolism as well as neural development and cell death. Moreover, the function and role of sortilin is now emerging in several major human diseases such as hypertension, atherosclerosis, coronary artery disease, Alzheimer's disease, and cancer. The SORT1 gene also contains one of 27 loci associated with increased risk of coronary artery disease.

== Structure ==
=== Gene ===
The SORT1 gene resides on chromosome 1 at the band 1p13.3 and includes 23 exons. This gene encodes 2 isoforms through alternative splicing.

=== Protein ===
Sortilin is a member of the Vps10p sorting receptor family. Crystallization studies of the protein reveal that, when complexed with the ligand neurotensin, the Vps10 ectodomain of sortilin forms a ten-bladed beta-propeller structure with an inner tunnel that contains multiple ligand binding sites. To prevent premature ligand binding during its synthesis, the precursor protein of sortilin contains a 44-amino acid pro-peptide that serves as a chaperone for the Vps10p domain. In addition, two hydrophobic loops have been detected in this domain and act to anchor the protein in the cell membrane. Sortilin has also been shown to undergo a conformational change and form a protein dimer in acidic conditions similar to ones found in the endosome, indicating a double mechanism for low pH-induced ligand release and possibly signaling towards recycling of the receptor.

== Function ==
In humans, sortilin is expressed over a wide range of cell types and tissues such as the brain, spinal cord, adrenal gland, thyroid, B-lymphocytes, adipocytes, skeletal muscle, and heart. As a sorting receptor on the cell surface and on the endoplasmic reticulum-Golgi apparatus within the cell, sortilin is involved in the transport of a wide variety of intracellular proteins between the trans-Golgi network, endosome, lysosome, and secretory granules, as well as the plasma membrane. This molecular function enables sortilin to participate in various biological processes, including the transport of GLUT4 to the plasma membrane of fat and skeletal muscle cells in response to insulin. It also mediates the interaction between proNGF and the p75NTR:sortilin complex by acting as a co-receptor to signal cell death. The fine regulation of the brain-derived neurotrophic factor (BDNF) by sortilin is required for both neuronal and tumor cell survival. Moreover, sortilin has been implicated in LDL-cholesterol metabolism, VLDL secretion, and PCSK9 secretion, and thus plays a role in the development of atherosclerotic lesions. It modulates lipid metabolism in adipocytes, hepatocytes, and macrophages. Other processes involving sortilin include endocytosis, negative regulation of lipoprotein lipase activity, myotube differentiation, ossification, and regulation of gene expression.

== Clinical significance ==
Given its function in facilitating lysosomal degradation or recycling of ligands in lipid metabolism and the neural system, sortilin likely plays an important role in the underlying mechanisms and pathophysiology of atherogenesis and coronary artery disease, as well as in neurological disorders. For example, sortilin has been identified as an important receptor for brain apolipoprotein E (APOE) metabolism, which is implicated in the underlying mechanisms of Alzheimer's disease. A significant role for sortilin has recently also been reported in the field of oncology, as it has been detected in several cancer cell lines. Notably, human cancerous epithelial cells exhibited increased levels of sortilin as compared to normal epithelial tissues. Furthermore, it appears that sortilin participates in the progression of breast cancer and contributes to tumor cell adhesion and invasion.

=== Clinical marker ===
In 2007, chromosome 1p13.3 was identified as a promising locus through a genome-wide approach in patients with coronary artery disease. Subsequently, accumulating evidence suggests that the SORT1 gene at the 1p13 locus is an important risk factor for coronary artery disease, which is attributed to lipid metabolism disorders. Several single nucleotide polymorphisms of the SORT1 gene have a genetic association between serum blood lipid levels and the pathogenesis of cardiometabolic syndrome, including obesity, hypertension, and coronary artery disease. As the role of sortilin in lipid metabolism and the development of atherosclerosis has been established, a recent study further reported that increased release of soluble sortilin from platelets, measured as circulating sortilin, may be associated with in vivo platelet activation. This observation also indicates that sortilin has a potential application as a clinical biomarker for diagnosis and prognosis. Additionally, a multi-locus genetic risk score study, based on a combination of 27 loci including the SORT1 gene, identified individuals at increased risk for both incident and recurrent coronary artery disease events, as well as an enhanced clinical benefit from statin therapy. The study was based on a community cohort study (the Malmo Diet and Cancer study) and four additional randomized controlled trials of primary prevention cohorts (JUPITER and ASCOT) and secondary prevention cohorts (CARE and PROVE IT-TIMI 22).

== Interactions ==
Sortilin has been shown to interact with GGA1 and GGA2.

=== Interactive Pathway Map ===
Sortilin participates in interactions within the trans-Golgi network vesicle budding and BDNF signaling pathways.

== See also ==
- Neurotensin receptor
