= Meclinertant =

Chemical compound

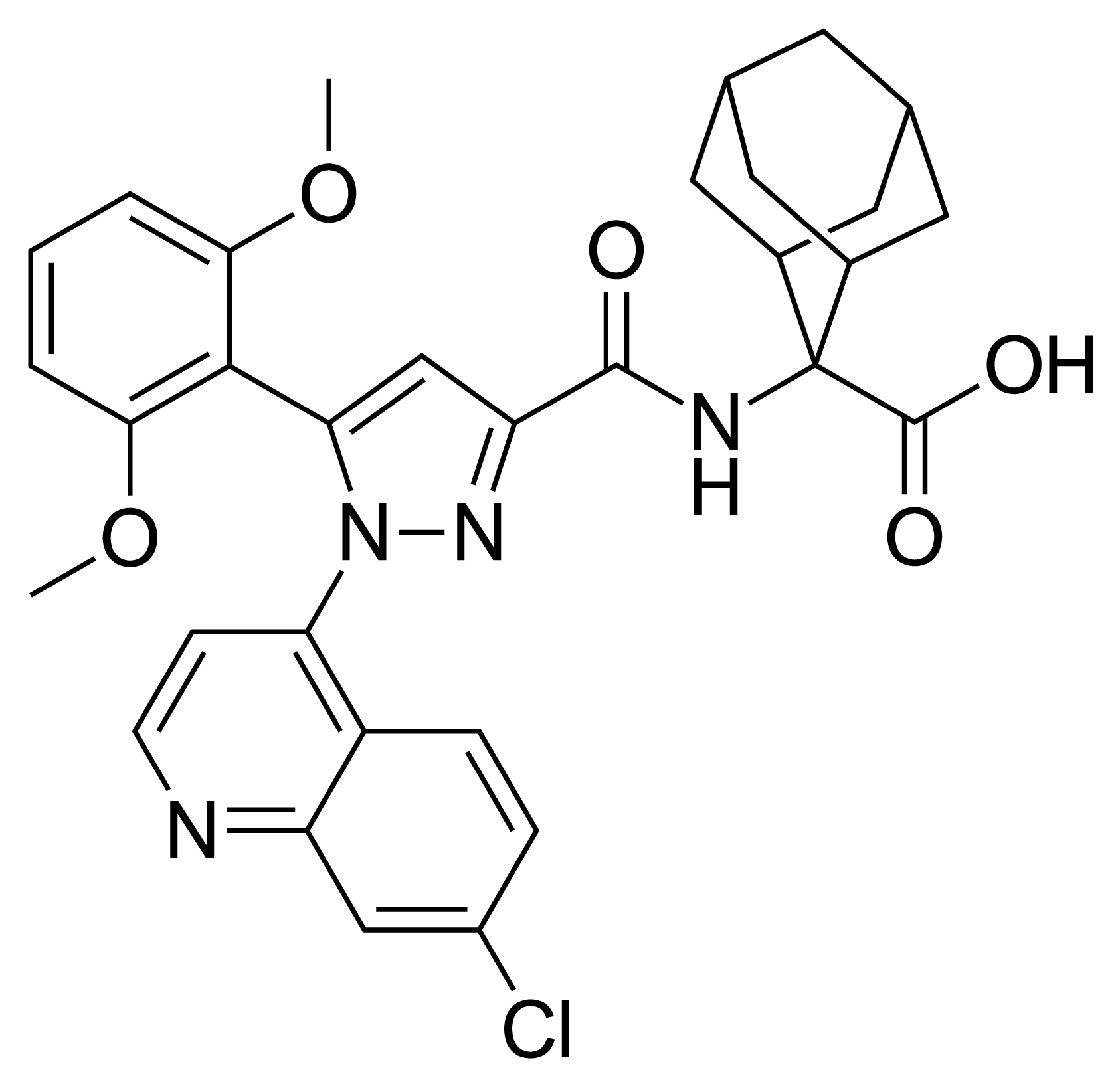

Identifiers
- IUPAC name: 2-([1-(7-Chloro-4-quinolinyl)-5-(2,6-dimethoxyphenyl)-1H-pyrazole-3-carbonyl]amino)adamantane-2-carboxylic acid
- CAS Number: 146362-70-1
- PubChem CID: 119192
- IUPHAR/BPS: 1582
- DrugBank: DB06455
- ChemSpider: 106480
- UNII: 5JBP4SI96H
- ChEBI: CHEBI:125516
- ChEMBL: ChEMBL506981
- CompTox Dashboard (EPA): DTXSID40163360

Chemical and physical data
- Formula: C_{32}H_{31}ClN_{4}O_{5}
- Molar mass: 587.07 g·mol^{−1}
- 3D model (JSmol): Interactive image
- SMILES: c7cc3c(cc7Cl)nccc3-n4nc(cc4-c1c(OC)cccc1OC)C(=O)NC2(C(O)=O)C5CC(C6)CC2CC6C5

Meclinertant (SR-48692) is a drug which acts as a selective, non-peptide antagonist at the neurotensin receptor NTS_{1}, and was the first non-peptide antagonist developed for this receptor. It is used in scientific research to explore the interaction between neurotensin and other neurotransmitters in the brain, and produces anxiolytic, anti-addictive and memory-impairing effects in animal studies.

== See also ==
- List of investigational antipsychotics
