= Levocabastine =

Chemical compound

- Skeletal structure of levocabastine

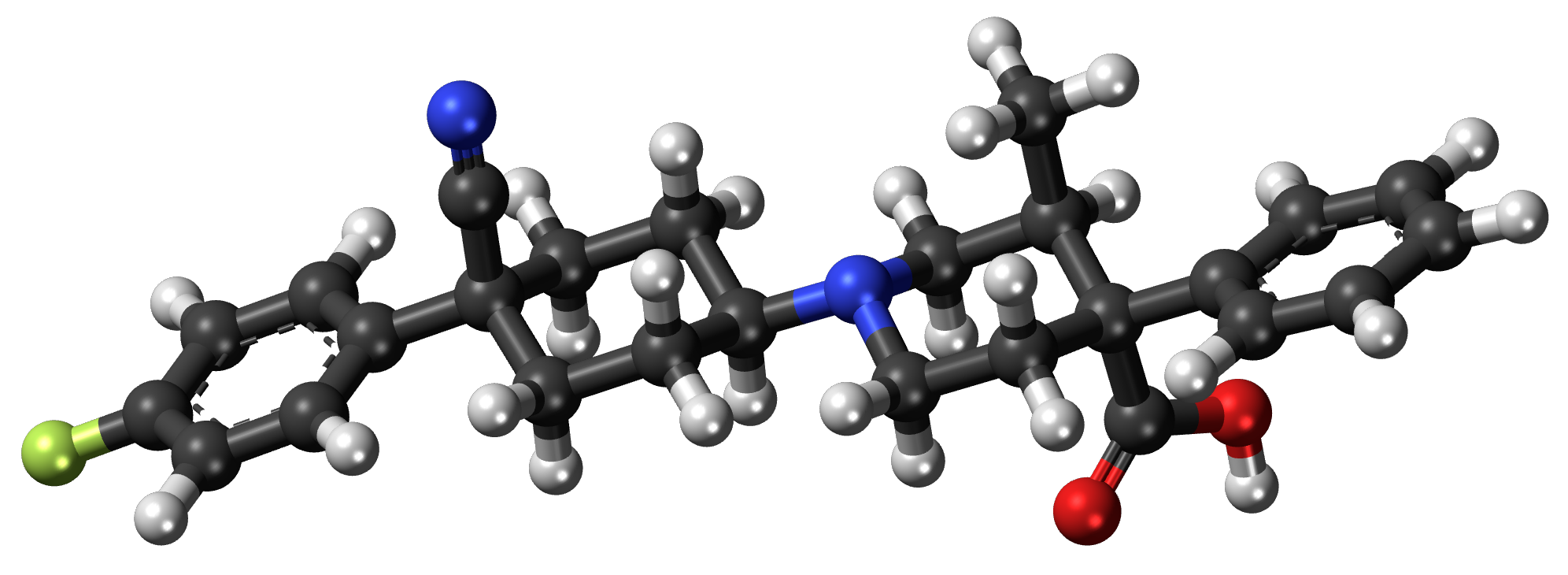
- 3D representation of a levocabastine molecule

Clinical data
- Trade names: Livostin
- AHFS/Drugs.com: Micromedex Detailed Consumer Information
- Pregnancy category: AU: B3
- Routes of administration: Ophthalmic, intranasal
- ATC code: R01AC02 (WHO) S01GX02 (WHO)

Legal status
- Legal status: US: ℞-only; In general: ℞ (Prescription only)

Identifiers
- IUPAC name: (3S,4R)-1-[cis-4-cyano-4-(4-fluorophenyl)cyclohexyl]-3-methyl-4-phenyl-4-piperidinecarboxylic acid
- CAS Number: 79516-68-0
- PubChem CID: 54385
- IUPHAR/BPS: 1586
- DrugBank: DB01106
- ChemSpider: 16736421
- UNII: H68BP06S81
- KEGG: D08117
- ChEMBL: ChEMBL1201312
- CompTox Dashboard (EPA): DTXSID1048548

Chemical and physical data
- Formula: C_{26}H_{29}FN_{2}O_{2}
- Molar mass: 420.528 g·mol^{−1}
- 3D model (JSmol): Interactive image
- SMILES: Fc1ccc(cc1)[C@]2(CC[C@@H](CC2)N3CC[C@@]([C@H](C)C3)(c4ccccc4)C(O)=O)C#N
- InChI: InChI=1S/C26H29FN2O2/c1-19-17-29(16-15-26(19,24(30)31)21-5-3-2-4-6-21)23-11-13-25(18-28,14-12-23)20-7-9-22(27)10-8-20/h2-10,19,23H,11-17H2,1H3,(H,30,31)/t19-,23-,25-,26-/m1/s1; Key:ZCGOMHNNNFPNMX-KYTRFIICSA-N

Levocabastine (trade name Livostin or Livocab, depending on the region) is a selective second-generation H_{1} receptor antagonist which was discovered at Janssen Pharmaceutica in 1979. It is used for allergic conjunctivitis.

As well as acting as an antihistamine, levocabastine has also subsequently been found to act as a potent and selective antagonist for the neurotensin receptor NTS_{2}, and was the first drug used to characterise the different neurotensin subtypes. This has made it a useful tool for the study of this receptor.

The pharmaceutical drug Bilina is a combination of Levocabastine, benzalkonium chloride, and other components and is typically used in a 0.5 mg/ml suspension as eye-drops, dispensed in 4ml bottles for the treatment of allergic conjunctivitis or similar allergic ocular conditions. Another formulation is available as a nasal spray for the management of allergic rhinitis.
