= SBI-810 =

Experimental drug

SBI-810 is an experimental analgesic drug. It is centrally acting and is designed to be a biased agonist on neurotensin receptor 1, in order to effectively reduce pain while avoiding other signals that could cause addiction.
