= SBI-553 =

Chemical compound

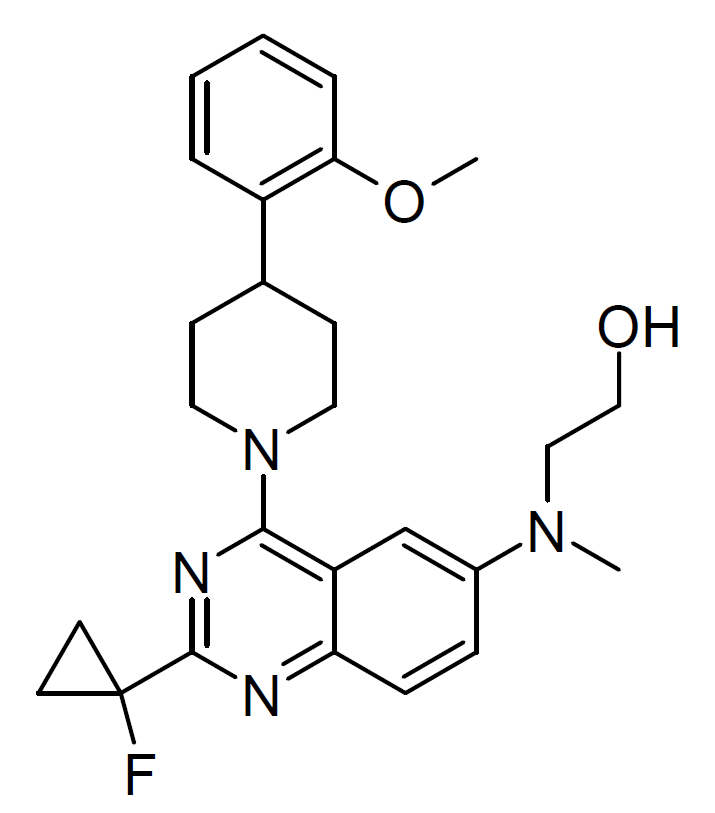

Clinical data
- ATC code: None

Identifiers
- IUPAC name: 2-{[2-(1-fluorocyclopropyl)-4-[4-(2-methoxyphenyl)piperidin-1-yl]quinazolin-6-yl]-methylamino}ethanol
- CAS Number: 1849603-72-0
- PubChem CID: 118610427
- ChemSpider: 78316967
- ChEMBL: ChEMBL4576388

Chemical and physical data
- Formula: C_{26}H_{31}FN_{4}O_{2}
- Molar mass: 450.558 g·mol^{−1}
- 3D model (JSmol): Interactive image
- SMILES: CN(CCO)C1=CC2=C(C=C1)N=C(N=C2N3CCC(CC3)C4=CC=CC=C4OC)C5(CC5)F
- InChI: InChI=1S/C26H31FN4O2/c1-30(15-16-32)19-7-8-22-21(17-19)24(29-25(28-22)26(27)11-12-26)31-13-9-18(10-14-31)20-5-3-4-6-23(20)33-2/h3-8,17-18,32H,9-16H2,1-2H3; Key:BLWXTJQMEBQCIZ-UHFFFAOYSA-N

SBI-553 is an experimental drug that binds to an intracellular pocket of neurotensin receptor 1 (NTSR1). It acts as a β-arrestin biased positive allosteric modulator and changes NTSR1 G protein preference, biasing NTSR1 away from Gq/11 and toward alternative G protein coupling. It has analgesic effects in animal studies, but importantly also reduces addictive behaviors produced by stimulants and μ-opioid receptor agonists in animal models, suggesting it may be useful as a novel agent for pain relief but which lacks the abuse liability of many currently used analgesic drugs, and may even reduce the potential for addiction when used alongside older analgesics.

A closely related derivative, SBI-810, has superior analgesic effects and may be more likely to be developed for clinical applications.

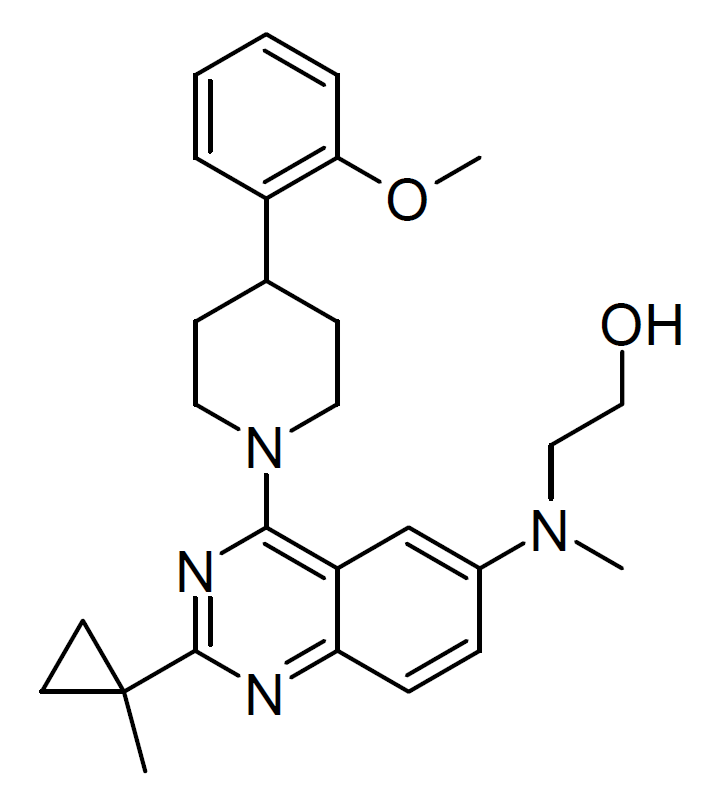
SBI-810, CAS# 1849603-79-7 (freebase) 2772746-58-2 (hydrochloride) PubChem 118617810
