= COPE (gene) =

Protein-coding gene in the species Homo sapiens

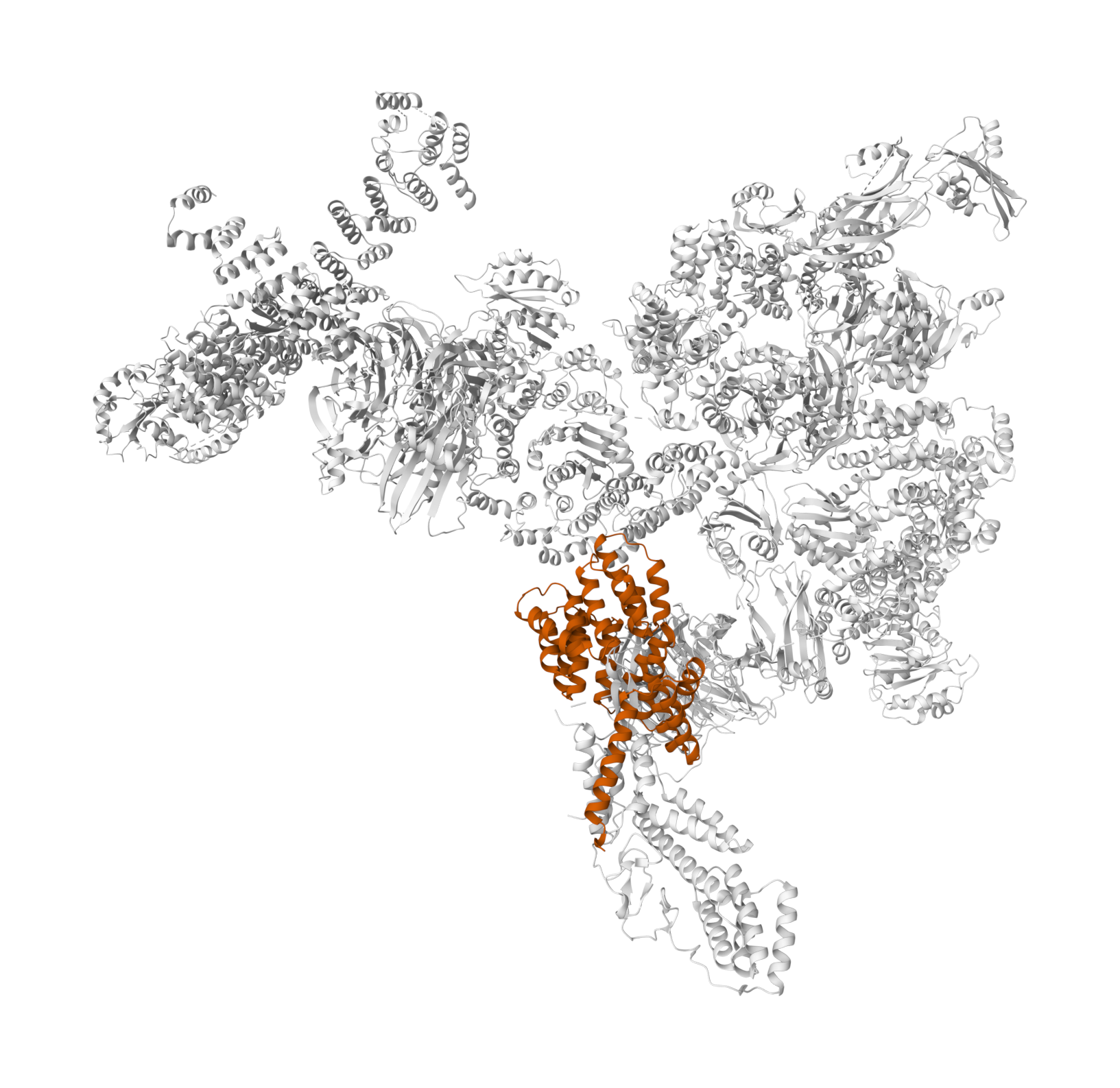

Identifiers
- Aliases: COPE, epsilon-COP, coatomer protein complex subunit epsilon, COPI coat complex subunit epsilon
- External IDs: OMIM: 606942; MGI: 1891702; GeneCards: COPE
Available structures
PDB	Ortholog search: PDBe RCSB
PDB	List of PDB id codes 5A1V, 5A1Y

Gene location (Human)
Chr.	Chromosome 19 (human)
Band	19p13.11	Start	18,899,514 bp
Band	19p13.11	End	18,919,387 bp

Gene location (Mouse)
Chr.	Chromosome 8 (mouse)
Band	8|8 B3.3	Start	70,755,168 bp
Band	8|8 B3.3	End	70,765,643 bp
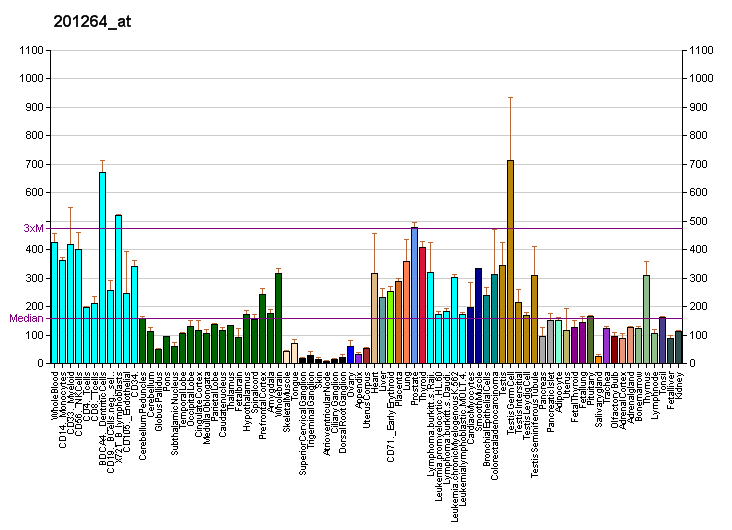
RNA expression pattern
Bgee	Human / Mouse (ortholog); Top expressed in: right testis; left testis; anterior pituitary; granulocyte; mucosa of transverse colon; C1 segment; left adrenal gland; right adrenal gland; left adrenal cortex; right lobe of thyroid gland / Top expressed in: seminal vesicula; saccule; islet of Langerhans; calvaria; salivary gland; right kidney; otic vesicle; duodenum; yolk sac; efferent ductule; More reference expression data
BioGPS	More reference expression data
Gene ontology
Molecular function	structural molecule activity; protein binding
Cellular component	cytoplasm; cytosol; Golgi apparatus; membrane; Golgi membrane; COPI-coated vesicle membrane; transport vesicle; nucleoplasm; COPI vesicle coat; cytoplasmic vesicle; endoplasmic reticulum membrane
Biological process	retrograde vesicle-mediated transport, Golgi to endoplasmic reticulum; endoplasmic reticulum to Golgi vesicle-mediated transport; protein transport; intra-Golgi vesicle-mediated transport; vesicle-mediated transport
Sources:Amigo / QuickGO
Orthologs
Databases	NCBI: entry; OMA: entry
Species	Human	Mouse
Entrez	11316	59042
Ensembl	ENSG00000105669	ENSMUSG00000055681
UniProt	O14579	O89079
RefSeq (mRNA)	NM_007263; NM_199442; NM_199444; NM_001330469; NM_025088	NM_021538
RefSeq (protein)	NP_001317398; NP_009194; NP_955474; NP_955476	NP_067513
Location (UCSC)	Chr 19: 18.9 – 18.92 Mb	Chr 8: 70.76 – 70.77 Mb
PubMed search
- Wikidata
View/Edit Human	View/Edit Mouse

Coatomer subunit epsilon is a protein that in humans is encoded by the COPE gene.

== Function ==
The product of this gene is an epsilon subunit of coatomer protein complex. Coatomer is a cytosolic protein complex that binds to dilysine motifs and reversibly associates with Golgi non-clathrin-coated vesicles. It is required for budding from Golgi membranes, and is essential for the retrograde Golgi-to-ER transport of dilysine-tagged proteins. Coatomer complex consists of at least the alpha, beta, beta', gamma, delta, epsilon and zeta subunits. Alternatively spliced transcript variants encoding different isoforms have been identified.

== Interactions ==
COPE (gene) has been shown to interact with COPA.
