= COPG =

Protein-coding gene in humans

COPG1
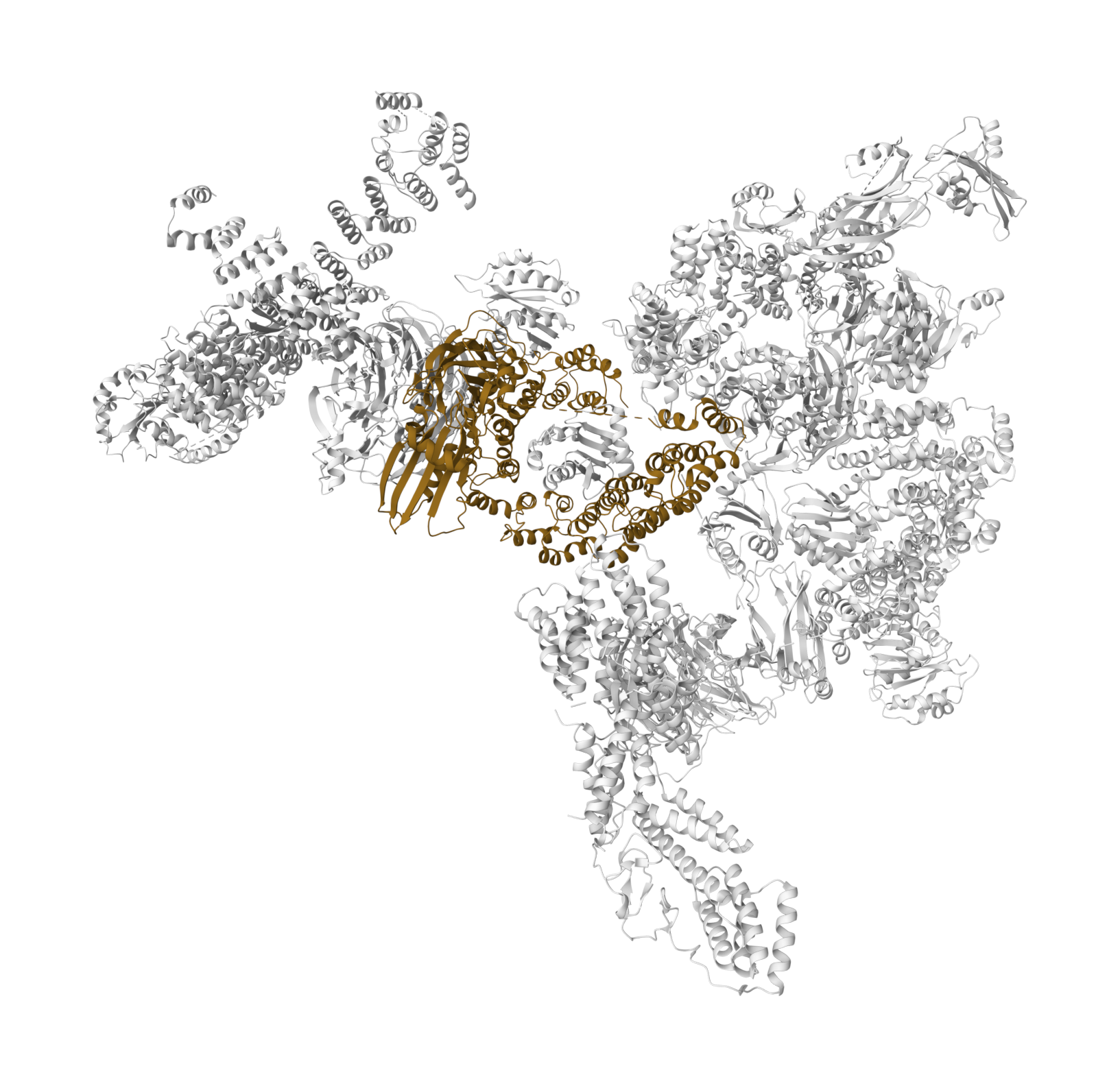

Identifiers
- Aliases: COPG1, COPG, coatomer protein complex subunit gamma 1, COPI coat complex subunit gamma 1
- External IDs: OMIM: 615525; MGI: 1858696; GeneCards: COPG1
Available structures
PDB	Ortholog search: PDBe RCSB
PDB	List of PDB id codes 1R4X

Gene location (Human)
Chr.	Chromosome 3 (human)
Band	3q21.3	Start	129,249,606 bp
Band	3q21.3	End	129,277,773 bp

Gene location (Mouse)
Chr.	Chromosome 6 (mouse)
Band	6 D1|6 39.13 cM	Start	87,864,796 bp
Band	6 D1|6 39.13 cM	End	87,890,577 bp
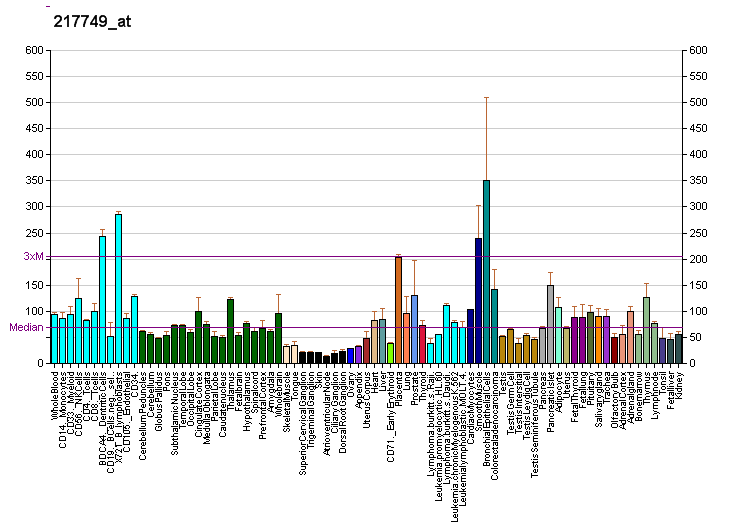
RNA expression pattern
Bgee	Human / Mouse (ortholog); Top expressed in: stromal cell of endometrium; anterior pituitary; body of pancreas; mucosa of transverse colon; islet of Langerhans; minor salivary glands; right lobe of thyroid gland; body of stomach; right adrenal gland; rectum / Top expressed in: yolk sac; dentate gyrus of hippocampal formation granule cell; molar; superior frontal gyrus; supraoptic nucleus; pituitary gland; dermis; central gray substance of midbrain; islet of Langerhans; crypt of lieberkuhn of small intestine; More reference expression data
BioGPS	More reference expression data
Gene ontology
Molecular function	protein binding; structural molecule activity
Cellular component	cytoplasm; membrane coat; COPI-coated vesicle membrane; membrane; transport vesicle; cytosol; cytoplasmic vesicle; Golgi apparatus; Golgi membrane; COPI vesicle coat; endoplasmic reticulum membrane; endoplasmic reticulum; endoplasmic reticulum-Golgi intermediate compartment
Biological process	retrograde vesicle-mediated transport, Golgi to endoplasmic reticulum; protein transport; organelle transport along microtubule; intracellular protein transport; establishment of Golgi localization; endoplasmic reticulum to Golgi vesicle-mediated transport; vesicle-mediated transport; intra-Golgi vesicle-mediated transport; protein secretion
Sources:Amigo / QuickGO
Orthologs
Databases	NCBI: entry; OMA: entry
Species	Human	Mouse
Entrez	22820	54161
Ensembl	ENSG00000181789	ENSMUSG00000030058
UniProt	Q9Y678	Q9QZE5
RefSeq (mRNA)	NM_016128	NM_017477; NM_201244
RefSeq (protein)	NP_057212	NP_059505; NP_957696
Location (UCSC)	Chr 3: 129.25 – 129.28 Mb	Chr 6: 87.86 – 87.89 Mb
PubMed search
- Wikidata
View/Edit Human	View/Edit Mouse

Coatomer subunit gamma is a protein that in humans is encoded by the COPG gene. It is one of seven proteins in the COPI coatomer complex that coats vesicles as they bud from the Golgi complex.

== Interactions ==
COPG has been shown to interact with Dopamine receptor D1, COPZ1 and COPB1.
