= COPB2 =

Protein-coding gene in humans

Identifiers
- Aliases: COPB2, beta'-COP, coatomer protein complex subunit beta 2, MCPH19, COPI coat complex subunit beta 2
- External IDs: OMIM: 606990; MGI: 1354962; GeneCards: COPB2
Available structures
PDB	Ortholog search: PDBe RCSB
PDB	List of PDB id codes 5A1U, 5A1V, 5A1W, 5A1X, 5A1Y

Gene location (Human)
Chr.	Chromosome 3 (human)
Band	3q23	Start	139,353,946 bp
Band	3q23	End	139,389,736 bp

Gene location (Mouse)
Chr.	Chromosome 9 (mouse)
Band	9|9 E3.3	Start	98,445,774 bp
Band	9|9 E3.3	End	98,470,435 bp
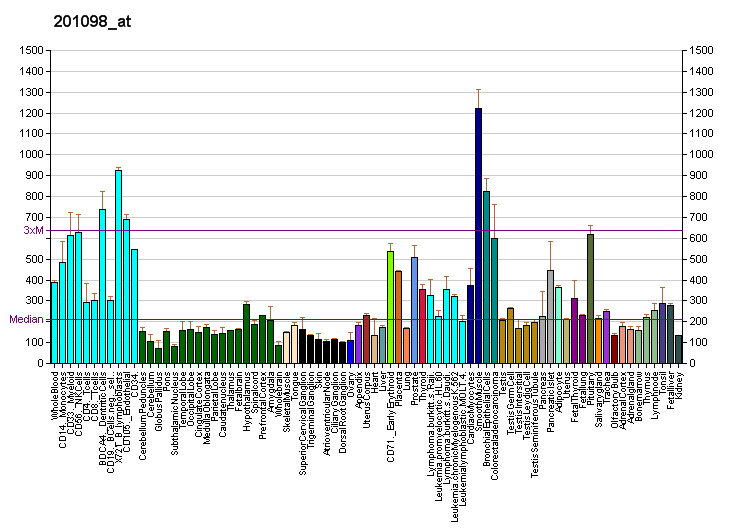
RNA expression pattern
Bgee	Human / Mouse (ortholog); Top expressed in: parotid gland; stromal cell of endometrium; beta cell; oral cavity; body of pancreas; mucosa of sigmoid colon; bronchial epithelial cell; smooth muscle tissue; Achilles tendon; rectum / Top expressed in: ascending aorta; aortic valve; lobe of prostate; Paneth cell; Rostral migratory stream; vas deferens; fossa; seminal vesicula; calvaria; pituitary gland; More reference expression data
BioGPS	More reference expression data
Gene ontology
Molecular function	structural molecule activity; protein binding
Cellular component	cytoplasm; cytosol; Golgi apparatus; membrane; Golgi membrane; COPI-coated vesicle membrane; transport vesicle; membrane coat; COPI vesicle coat; cytoplasmic vesicle; endoplasmic reticulum membrane
Biological process	retrograde vesicle-mediated transport, Golgi to endoplasmic reticulum; toxin transport; endoplasmic reticulum to Golgi vesicle-mediated transport; protein transport; intracellular protein transport; intra-Golgi vesicle-mediated transport; vesicle-mediated transport
Sources:Amigo / QuickGO
Orthologs
Databases	NCBI: entry; OMA: entry
Species	Human	Mouse
Entrez	9276	50797
Ensembl	ENSG00000184432	ENSMUSG00000032458
UniProt	P35606	O55029
RefSeq (mRNA)	NM_004766	NM_015827
RefSeq (protein)	NP_004757	NP_056642
Location (UCSC)	Chr 3: 139.35 – 139.39 Mb	Chr 9: 98.45 – 98.47 Mb
PubMed search
- Wikidata
View/Edit Human	View/Edit Mouse

Coatomer subunit beta is a protein that is encoded by the COPB2 gene in humans.

== Function ==
The Golgi coatomer complex (see MIM 601924) constitutes the coat of non-clathrin-coated vesicles and is essential for Golgi budding and vesicular trafficking. It consists of 7 protein subunits, including COPB2.[supplied by OMIM]

== Interactions ==
COPB2 has been shown to interact with:

- COPB1,
- PRKCE, and
- RGS4.
