= Mediated transport =

Transportation of substances via membrane

Mediated transport refers to cellular transport mediated at the lipid bilayer through phospholipid interactions, or more frequently membrane transport proteins. Substances in the human body may be hydrophobic, electrophilic, contain a positively or negatively charge, or have another property. As such there are times when those substances may not be able to pass over the cell membrane using protein-independent movement. The cell membrane is imbedded with many membrane transport proteins that allow such molecules to travel in and out of the cell. There are three types of mediated transporters: uniport, symport, and antiport. Things that can be transported are nutrients, ions, glucose, etc, all depending on the needs of the cell. One example of a uniport mediated transport protein is GLUT1. GLUT1 is a transmembrane protein, which means it spans the entire width of the cell membrane, connecting the extracellular and intracellular region. It is a uniport system because it specifically transports glucose in only one direction, down its concentration gradient across the cell membrane.

Another example of a uniporter mediated transport protein is microsomal triglyceride transfer protein (MTTP) who is responsible for catalyzing the assembly of the triglyceride rich lipoproteins as well mediating their release from the lumen of the endoplasmic reticulum. What is distinguishable about this specific transfer protein is that it requires the protein PRAP1 to bind to the lipoprotein to facilitate the transport of said lipoprotein. MTTP only recognizes the PRAP1-lipoprotein complex and only then will it catalyze the transport reaction. In a way, the PRAP1 protein acts as a signal for MTTP. The importance of such interactions implies that mediated transport is not only dependent on transmembrane proteins but can also require the presence of additional non-transmembrane proteins. For instance, studies show that in the absence of a fully functional PRAP1 protein, MTTP fails to transport specific lipoproteins across the endoplasmic reticulum membrane.

An example of a symporter mediated transport protein is SGLT1, a sodium/glucose co-transporter protein that is mainly found in the intestinal tract. The SGLT1 protein is a symporter system because it passes both glucose and sodium in the same direction, from the lumen of the intestine to inside the intestinal cells.

An example of an antiporter mediated transport protein is the sodium-calcium antiporter, a transport protein involved in keeping the cytoplasmic concentration of calcium ions in the cells, low. This transport protein is an antiporter system because it transports three sodium ions across the plasma membrane in exchange for a calcium ion, which is transported in the opposite direction.

Types of Mediated Transporters		
Uniporter (I)	Symporter (II)	Antiporter (III)
Allows transportation of one solute at a time	Transports solute and countertransported solute at the same time and in the same direction	Transports the solute in one direction while the countertransported solute is moved the opposite direction in or out of the cell

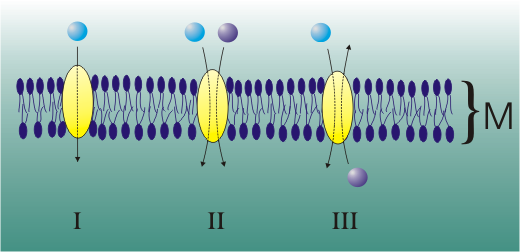
Uniport, Symport, Antiport

Mechanism of transport. A molecule will bind to a transporter protein, altering its shape. The change of shape or other added substances such as ATP will, in turn, cause the transport protein to alter its shape and release the molecule onto the other side of the cell membrane.

== Types of Transport ==
- Facilitated diffusion
- Active transport

Facilitated Diffusion	Active Transport
No energy source needed	Requires ATP
Moves substance from high to low concentration	Can create concentration gradients and moves molecules from low to high concentrations
Transport Protein required	Transport Protein required

== Mutations in Transport Proteins ==
The importance of mediated transport proteins is visualized with the presence of mutations that render the transport proteins nonfunctional. A prime example of this are mutations found within the Archain 1 gene which codes for the transport proteins COPI and COPII. The main function of these transport proteins is to facilitate the passage of molecules from the endoplasmic reticulum to the golgi apparatus, and vice versa. The mutated ARCN1 gene gives rise to abnormal COPI who fails to transport type I collagen and leads to the secretion of collagen. Due to the fact that type I collagen is the main ingredient of connective tissue, such mutations are the cause of numerous severe skeletal disorders such as osteogenesis imperfecta and cranio-lenticulo-sutural dysplasia. Various variations of these disorders are characterized by visible physical dysplasia. This example highlights the importance of transport proteins, not only as a means for the passage of specific molecules across a membrane, but for proper bodily development.
