= Principality of Copa =

- 14th c.–1475
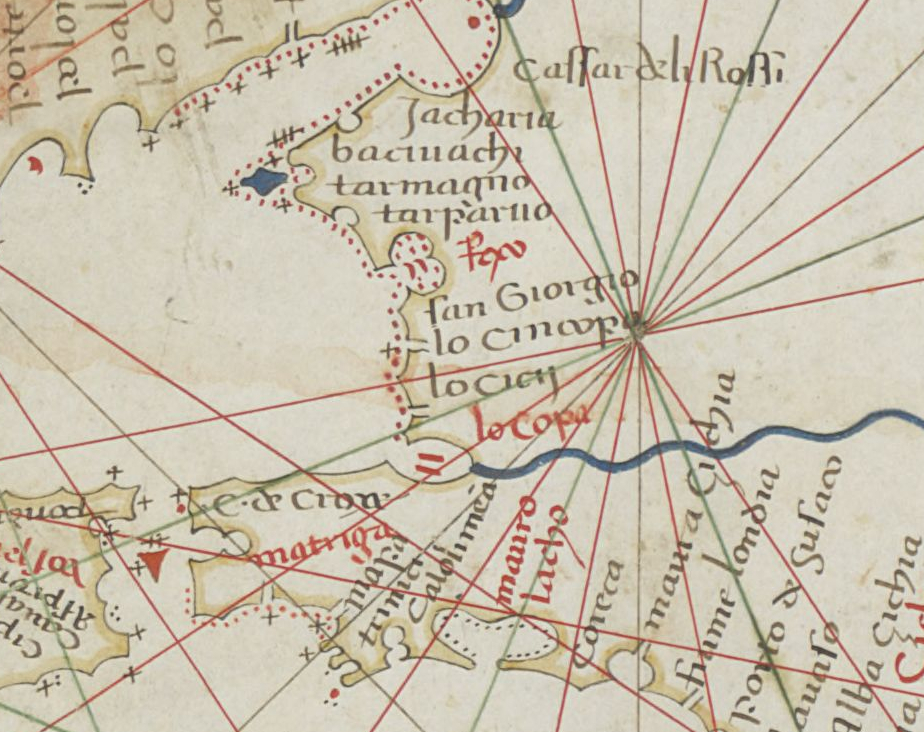
- Copa and other ports in the eastern Sea of Azov in the 1466 Portolan Atlas
- Capital: Copa
- Government: Principality (Member of the Confederative Zichia)
  - Prince: Berzebuk (last leader)
- History
  - Established: 14th c.
  - Disestablished: 1475
- Today part of: Russia

The Principality of Copa (Italian: Copa, Kopa or Copario) was a Circassian principality that developed during the 14th and 15th centuries. It was established around the city of Copa. The principality was part of the confederative structure of Zichia. Information about the principality comes from Genoese sources.

The Circassian name of the principality is unknown. However, the city's name may be etymologically related to the Adyghe word къопIашъ (qopash), meaning "large pig," or to the ancient Sind settlement of Kepi.

== Geography ==
The Principality of Copa controlled the region between the Kuban River and the Sea of Azov. The city of Copa was located 28 Genoese nautical miles from the mouth of the Kuban River. Copa was a large settlement and was situated within a feudal domain. It was the largest city in Circassia after Matrega. It's political and military influence of the principality extended over the entire eastern coast of the Sea of Azov. There are varying academic estimates about the location of the city, which was the administrative center of the principality, with some suggesting it was either in the modern Temryuk region or near Slavyansk na Kubani. I.V. Volkov proposed to separate the names Copa and Copario: Copa as the settlement where the Genoese administration and Copario as the entire territory under Copa's control.

The Florentine merchant Francesco Balducci Pegolotti described the eastern ports of the Sea of Azov as belonging to Zichia. There also existed a view that the city of Tana was located within Zichian territory.

== History ==
A major annual fair was held in Copa every April and May. According to the 1449 statute of Caffa, a consul was appointed to Copa. However, the consul did not reside permanently in the city; he lived in Caffa and traveled to Copa during the fishing season (spring and summer). His duties included negotiating seasonal fish prices with the local prince and paying annual tributes to the princes of Zichia. The Genoese were especially active in purchasing slaves in Copa. Many of the inhabitants of Kopa were indebted to Genoese creditors in Caffa. Local princes prevented the extradition or arrest of these debtors in order to protect their subjects. The settlement also had a Greek population.

In the second half of the 15th century, Genoese sources mention Prince Berzebuk (Note: Also written as Belzebok, Belzebuk or Berzebuch) (Dominus Coparii Berzebuch) as the ruler of the principality. The name Prince Berzebuk is thought to have originated in Adyghe from Barasbiyeqo (Бэрасбиекъо). In 1462, the Genoese signed an agreement with Berzebuk for hiring mercenary soldiers. Berzebuk was reluctant to return debtors from Caffa or follow Genoese commercial regulations. When the authorities of Caffa boycotted trade with Copa in 1471, Berzebuk seized Genoese goods. He also stopped protecting Genoese ships from pirates, forcing the officials in Caffa to send a warship for protection. This situation pushed the Genoese to negotiate. The Caffa consul Oberto Scuarchiafico sent an envoy, Cavalino Cavallo, in May 1471 to conclude a new treaty with the Circassian princes. The agreement was signed with Prince Petrezok of Zichia, Prince Biberd of Kremuk (Chemguy), and Prince Berzebuk of Copa together with his wife Borunda. On 15 December 1472, the officials of Caffa declared the separate peace with Berzebuk to be beneficial.

Berzebuk's wife Borunda held greater authority than her husband within the principality. Their son was named Kambelot (Qambolet). Prince Berzebuk possessed significant wealth and built a stone castle in Copa. The materials needed for the construction were brought by ships with a secret agreement from an individual from Caffa. Following the construction of the castle, the Bank of San Giorgio issued a special decree prohibiting local authorities from selling stone, construction timber, and iron. To prevent Berzebuk from gaining power, Genoese officials tried to conduct secret diplomatic negotiations with Prince Biberd and other Circassian princes against him. Within the religious administration of the region, the existence of a Catholic diocese called Lukuk (Lochicopa) is recorded.

In 1475, after the Ottoman conquest of Caffa, Ottoman forces attacked and devastated the city of Copa. An unnamed prince leader was killed while defending the city, and he is believed to have been Berzebuk, or his successor (possibly Kambolet). Many other local princes were also killed during the defense. With the fall of the city and the death of its leaders, the political existence of the principality came to an end.

The Ottomans did not remain in Copa in 1475, but they invaded the region again during their first major expedition in 1479. During this campaign, the Ottomans captured the fortresses of Copa and Anapa (Ana-Maparium). G. Interiano described Circassian customs and lifestyle using examples from this region.

The Principality of Copa is considered the direct successor or prototype of the Principality of Zhaney, which appears in documents from the 16th century.
