= COPZ1 =

Protein-coding gene in humans

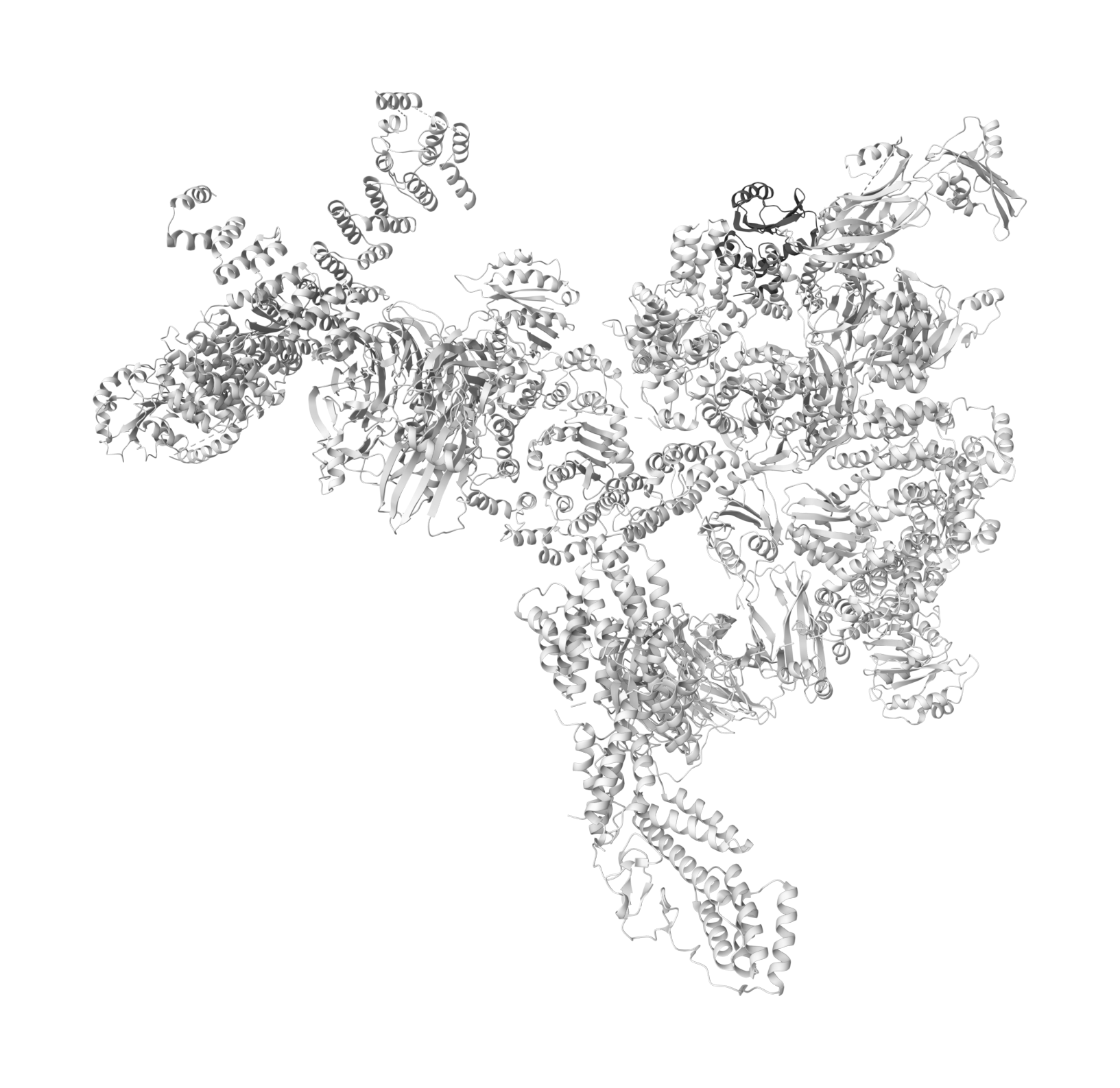

Identifiers
- Aliases: COPZ1, COPZ, HSPC181, zeta-COP, zeta1-COP, CGI-120, coatomer protein complex subunit zeta 1, COPI coat complex subunit zeta 1
- External IDs: OMIM: 615472; MGI: 1929063; GeneCards: COPZ1
Available structures
PDB	Ortholog search: PDBe RCSB
PDB	List of PDB id codes 2HF6, 5A1U, 5A1V, 5A1W, 5A1X, 5A1Y

Gene location (Human)
Chr.	Chromosome 12 (human)
Band	12q13.13	Start	54,301,202 bp
Band	12q13.13	End	54,351,846 bp

Gene location (Mouse)
Chr.	Chromosome 15 (mouse)
Band	15 F3|15 58.74 cM	Start	103,181,141 bp
Band	15 F3|15 58.74 cM	End	103,208,295 bp
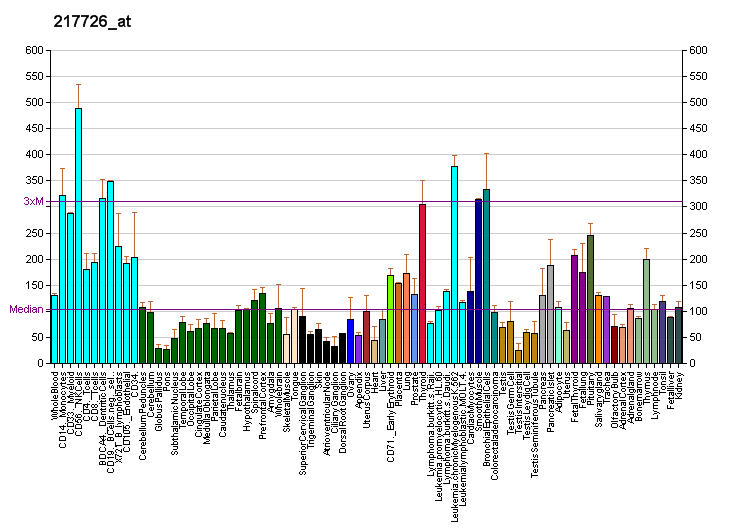
RNA expression pattern
Bgee	Human / Mouse (ortholog); Top expressed in: islet of Langerhans; body of pancreas; ventricular zone; stromal cell of endometrium; ganglionic eminence; rectum; monocyte; right adrenal gland; gallbladder; smooth muscle tissue / Top expressed in: yolk sac; dermis; duodenum; right kidney; epithelium of stomach; human fetus; jejunum; islet of Langerhans; neural tube; choroid plexus of fourth ventricle; More reference expression data
BioGPS	More reference expression data
Orthologs
Databases	NCBI: entry; OMA: entry
Species	Human	Mouse
Entrez	22818	56447
Ensembl	ENSG00000111481	ENSMUSG00000060992
UniProt	P61923	P61924
RefSeq (mRNA)	NM_001271734; NM_001271735; NM_001271736; NM_016057	NM_019817; NM_001357748
RefSeq (protein)	NP_001258663; NP_001258664; NP_001258665; NP_057141	NP_062791; NP_001344677
Location (UCSC)	Chr 12: 54.3 – 54.35 Mb	Chr 15: 103.18 – 103.21 Mb
PubMed search
- Wikidata
View/Edit Human	View/Edit Mouse

Coatomer subunit zeta-1 is a protein that in humans is encoded by the COPZ1 gene.

== Interactions ==
COPZ1 has been shown to interact with COPG.
