= Neurotensin receptor 1 =

Protein found in humans

NTSR1

Identifiers
- Aliases: NTSR1, NTR, Neurotensin receptor 1, neurotensin receptor 1 (high affinity), NTR1
- External IDs: OMIM: 162651; MGI: 97386; GeneCards: NTSR1
Available structures
PDB	Ortholog search: PDBe RCSB
PDB	List of PDB id codes 2LYW

Gene location (Human)
Chr.	Chromosome 20 (human)
Band	20q13.33	Start	62,708,836 bp
Band	20q13.33	End	62,762,771 bp

Gene location (Mouse)
Chr.	Chromosome 2 (mouse)
Band	2 H4|2 103.04 cM	Start	180,141,769 bp
Band	2 H4|2 103.04 cM	End	180,186,773 bp
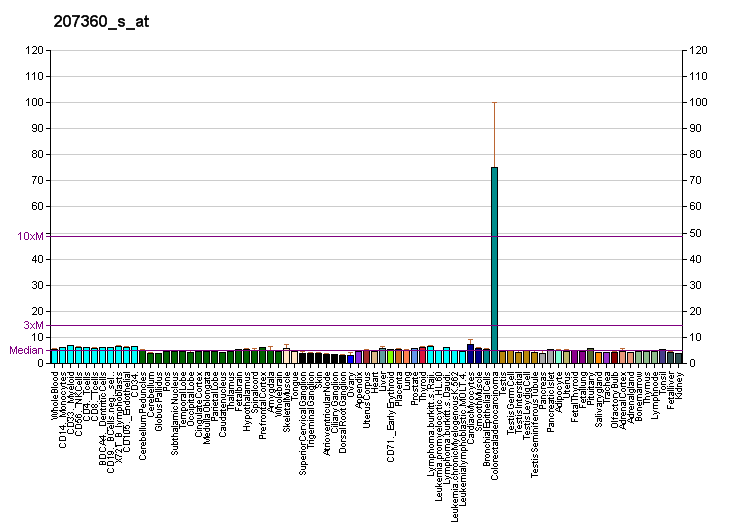
RNA expression pattern
Bgee	Human / Mouse (ortholog); Top expressed in: muscle layer of sigmoid colon; granulocyte; substantia nigra; prefrontal cortex; monocyte; transverse colon; blood; ganglionic eminence; epithelium of colon; cingulate gyrus / Top expressed in: barrel cortex; substantia nigra; ventral tegmental area; embryo; visual cortex; zygote; medullary collecting duct; dorsomedial hypothalamic nucleus; central gray substance of midbrain; nucleus of stria terminalis; More reference expression data
BioGPS	More reference expression data
Gene ontology
Molecular function	G protein-coupled receptor activity; protein homodimerization activity; protein N-terminus binding; signal transducer activity; protein binding; G protein-coupled neurotensin receptor activity; identical protein binding; protein heterodimerization activity
Cellular component	cytoplasm; axon terminus; integral component of membrane; perikaryon; Golgi apparatus; membrane; plasma membrane; dendritic spine; integral component of plasma membrane; synapse; dendritic shaft; cell surface; axon; terminal bouton; soma; dendrite; symmetric synapse; endoplasmic reticulum; mitochondrion; neuron spine; membrane raft; cytoplasmic side of plasma membrane
Biological process	positive regulation of cation channel activity; G protein-coupled receptor signaling pathway; regulation of sensory perception of pain; positive regulation of inositol phosphate biosynthetic process; positive regulation of inhibitory postsynaptic potential; adult locomotory behavior; regulation of respiratory gaseous exchange; negative regulation of apoptotic process; positive regulation of release of sequestered calcium ion into cytosol; D-aspartate import across plasma membrane; learning; inositol phosphate catabolic process; regulation of membrane depolarization; detection of temperature stimulus involved in sensory perception of pain; response to lipid; positive regulation of arachidonic acid secretion; positive regulation of glutamate secretion; positive regulation of apoptotic process; negative regulation of release of sequestered calcium ion into cytosol; positive regulation of gamma-aminobutyric acid secretion; temperature homeostasis; neuropeptide signaling pathway; negative regulation of systemic arterial blood pressure; signal transduction; regulation of action potential; chemical synaptic transmission; L-glutamate import across plasma membrane
Sources:Amigo / QuickGO
Orthologs
Databases	NCBI: entry; OMA: entry
Species	Human	Mouse
Entrez	4923	18216
Ensembl	ENSG00000101188	ENSMUSG00000027568
UniProt	P30989	O88319
RefSeq (mRNA)	NM_002531	NM_018766
RefSeq (protein)	NP_002522	NP_061236
Location (UCSC)	Chr 20: 62.71 – 62.76 Mb	Chr 2: 180.14 – 180.19 Mb
PubMed search
- Wikidata
View/Edit Human	View/Edit Mouse

Neurotensin receptor type 1 is a protein that in humans is encoded by the NTSR1 gene. The neurotensin receptor is primarily responsible for mediating the effects of the neuropeptide neurotensin.

== Structure ==
Neurotensin receptor type 1 (NTSR1) is a member of the class A G protein-coupled receptor (GPCR) superfamily, characterized by its canonical structure of seven transmembrane α-helices connected by extracellular and intracellular loops. High-resolution crystal structures of NTSR1 have been determined in various functional states, including complexes with peptide agonists (such as the endogenous neurotensin fragment NTS8-13), non-peptide agonists, partial agonists, and antagonists, as well as in the ligand-free (apo) state.

The neurotensin binding pocket is located on the extracellular side of the receptor, where neurotensin binds in an extended conformation nearly perpendicular to the membrane, with the C-terminus oriented toward the receptor core. Key interactions involve charged residues in the binding pocket and the C-terminal arginine of neurotensin, while the receptor's activation is associated with conformational changes that propagate from the ligand-binding site through the transmembrane helices to the intracellular side. The intracellular region of NTSR1 interacts with G proteins and β-arrestins, facilitating downstream signaling and receptor internalization; phosphorylation of specific intracellular sites is critical for stable β-arrestin binding. Notably, the receptor also contains an amphipathic helix 8 following transmembrane helix 7, although its stability and presence may vary among different receptor states and constructs.

== Function ==
Neurotensin receptor 1, also called NTSR1, belongs to the large superfamily of G-protein coupled receptors and is considered a class A GPCR. NTSR1 mediates multiple biological processes through modulation by neurotensin, such as low blood pressure, high blood sugar, low body temperature, antinociception, anti-neuronal damage and regulation of intestinal motility and secretion.

=== Neuromodulation ===
SBI-553 is an intracellular allosteric modulator that promotes β-arrestin recruitment but not canonical Gq signaling. SBI-553 exerts β-arrestin-dependent effects on rodent behavior.

The anti-nociceptive properties of NTSR1 has been shown to be modulated by SBI-810, an analog of SBI-553 via inhibition of NMDA receptor activity as well as extracellular-regulated signal kinase signaling in spinal cord neurons. SBI-810 outperformed gabapentin and oliceridine in reducing opioid-induced reduced conditioned place preference, guarding, and facial grimacing in mice, indicating superior mitigation of opioid withdrawal.

== Ligands ==
- Neurotensin (NT)
- ML314 – β-arrestin biased modulator
- SBI-553 - β-arrestin biased modulator

== See also ==
- Neurotensin receptor
