= Archain 1 =

Protein-coding gene in the species Homo sapiens

ARCN1

Identifiers
- Aliases: ARCN1, COPD, archain 1, SRMMD
- External IDs: OMIM: 600820; MGI: 2387591; GeneCards: ARCN1
Available structures
PDB	Ortholog search: PDBe RCSB
PDB	List of PDB id codes 5A1U, 5A1V, 5A1W, 5A1X, 5A1Y

Gene location (Human)
Chr.	Chromosome 11 (human)
Band	11q23.3	Start	118,572,390 bp
Band	11q23.3	End	118,603,033 bp

Gene location (Mouse)
Chr.	Chromosome 9 (mouse)
Band	9|9 A5.2	Start	44,652,861 bp
Band	9|9 A5.2	End	44,679,142 bp
RNA expression pattern
Bgee	Human / Mouse (ortholog); Top expressed in: islet of Langerhans; stromal cell of endometrium; body of pancreas; Achilles tendon; cardia; jejunal mucosa; beta cell; anterior pituitary; corpus epididymis; urethra / Top expressed in: seminal vesicula; lacrimal gland; parotid gland; epithelium of small intestine; molar; lobe of prostate; umbilical cord; human fetus; dermis; gastrula; More reference expression data
BioGPS	n/a
Gene ontology
Molecular function	RNA binding
Cellular component	cytosol; membrane; Golgi membrane; COPI-coated vesicle membrane; transport vesicle; endoplasmic reticulum; COPI vesicle coat; cytoplasmic vesicle; COPI-coated vesicle; endoplasmic reticulum membrane; cytoplasm; Golgi apparatus
Biological process	retrograde vesicle-mediated transport, Golgi to endoplasmic reticulum; cerebellar Purkinje cell layer maturation; adult locomotory behavior; endoplasmic reticulum to Golgi vesicle-mediated transport; Golgi vesicle transport; protein transport; pigmentation; intracellular protein transport; vesicle-mediated transport; transport; Golgi localization
Sources:Amigo / QuickGO
Orthologs
Databases	NCBI: entry; OMA: entry
Species	Human	Mouse
Entrez	372	213827
Ensembl	ENSG00000095139	ENSMUSG00000032096
UniProt	P48444	Q5XJY5
RefSeq (mRNA)	NM_001142281; NM_001655	NM_145985
RefSeq (protein)	NP_001135753; NP_001646	NP_666097
Location (UCSC)	Chr 11: 118.57 – 118.6 Mb	Chr 9: 44.65 – 44.68 Mb
PubMed search
- Wikidata
View/Edit Human	View/Edit Mouse

Archain 1 is a protein that in humans is encoded by the ARCN1 gene. Also called coatomer subunit delta, this protein is a component of the coatomer complex, and is involved in the (retrograde) transport of proteins from the Golgi apparatus to the endoplasmic reticulum.

== Function ==
This gene maps in a region, which include the mixed lineage leukemia and Friend leukemia virus integration 1 genes, where multiple disease-associated chromosome translocations occur. It is an intracellular protein. Archain sequences are well conserved among eukaryotes and this protein may play a fundamental role in eukaryotic cell biology. It has similarities to heat shock proteins and clathrin-associated proteins, and may be involved in vesicle structure or vesicle trafficking.
