= COPB1 =

Protein-coding gene in humans

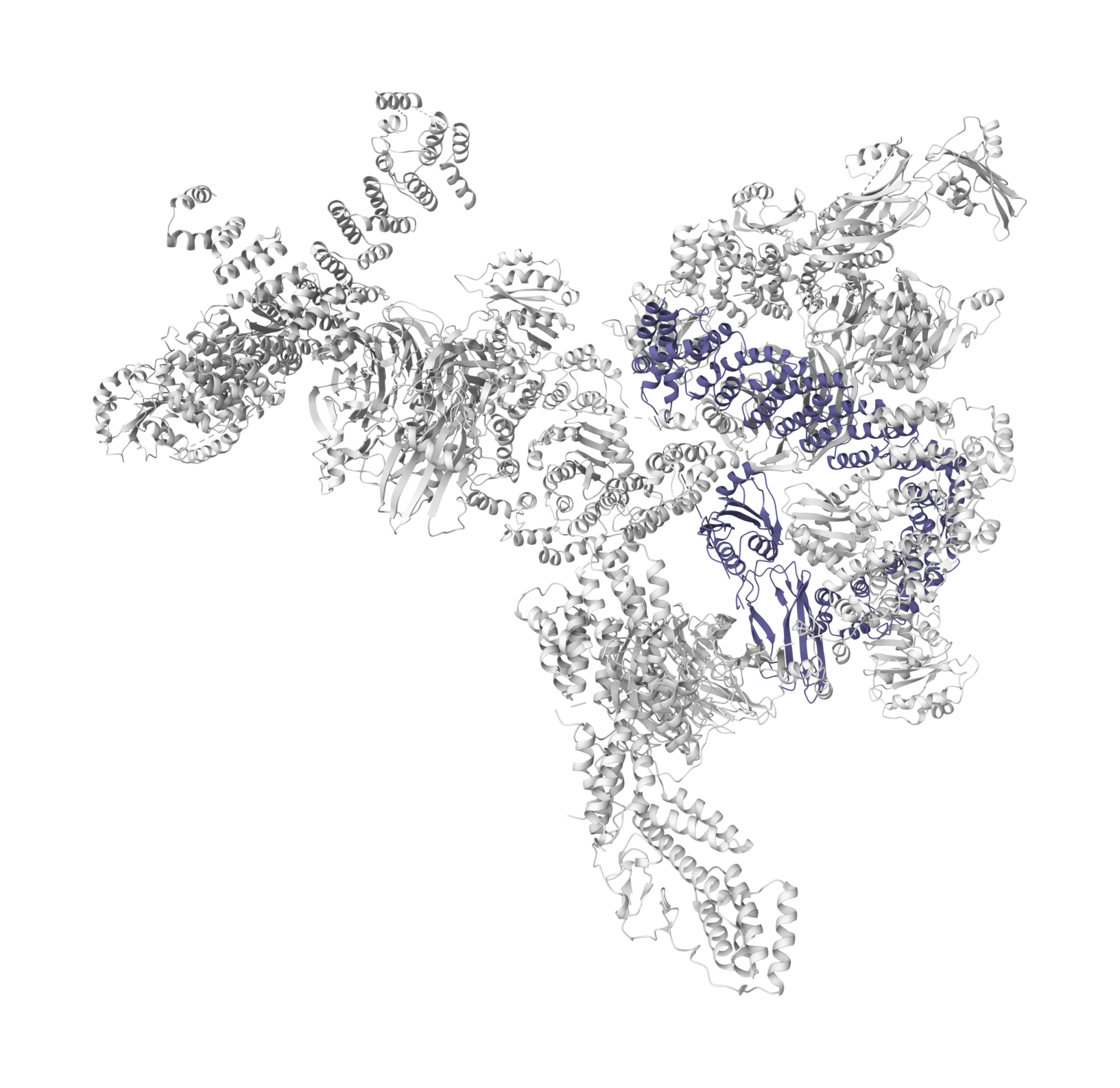

Identifiers
- Aliases: COPB1, COPB, coatomer protein complex subunit beta 1, COPI coat complex subunit beta 1, BARMACS
- External IDs: OMIM: 600959; MGI: 1917599; GeneCards: COPB1
Available structures
PDB	Ortholog search: PDBe RCSB
PDB	List of PDB id codes 5A1U, 5A1V, 5A1W, 5A1X, 5A1Y

Gene location (Human)
Chr.	Chromosome 11 (human)
Band	11p15.2	Start	14,443,440 bp
Band	11p15.2	End	14,500,027 bp

Gene location (Mouse)
Chr.	Chromosome 7 (mouse)
Band	7 F1|7 59.31 cM	Start	113,814,794 bp
Band	7 F1|7 59.31 cM	End	113,853,946 bp
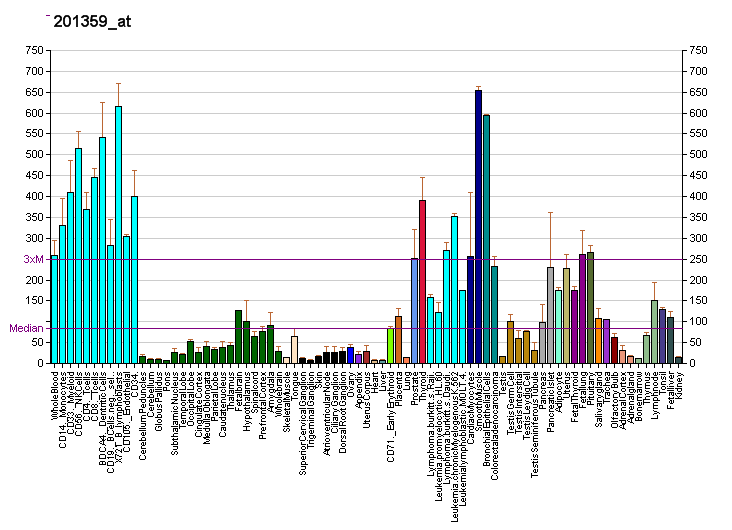

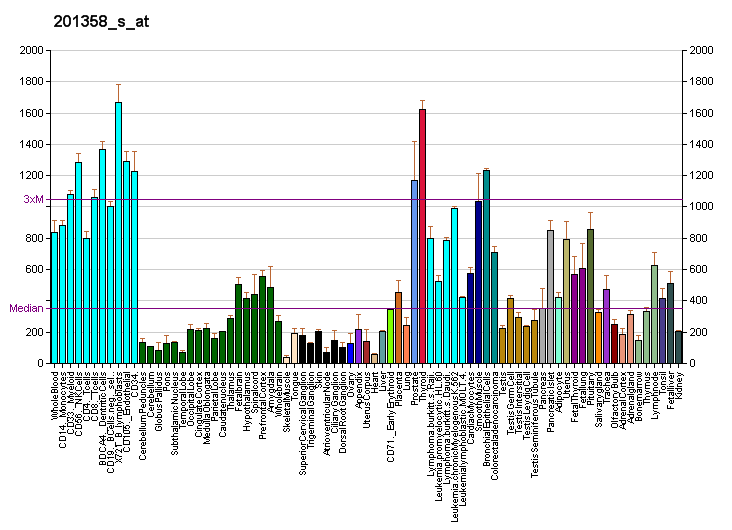
RNA expression pattern
Bgee	Human / Mouse (ortholog); Top expressed in: Epithelium of choroid plexus; pancreatic ductal cell; corpus epididymis; caput epididymis; endothelial cell; germinal epithelium; epithelium of nasopharynx; tibia; tail of epididymis; jejunal mucosa / Top expressed in: parotid gland; basilar part of occipital bone; secondary oocyte; dermis; molar; calvaria; islet of Langerhans; endocardial cushion; submandibular gland; atrioventricular valve; More reference expression data
BioGPS	More reference expression data
Gene ontology
Molecular function	structural molecule activity; protein binding
Cellular component	Golgi apparatus; membrane; intracellular membrane-bounded organelle; Golgi membrane; COPI-coated vesicle membrane; transport vesicle; Golgi-associated vesicle; membrane coat; cytoplasmic vesicle; COPI-coated vesicle; endoplasmic reticulum-Golgi intermediate compartment; endoplasmic reticulum membrane; cytoplasm; cytosol; plasma membrane; COPI vesicle coat; secretory granule membrane; tertiary granule membrane; ficolin-1-rich granule membrane
Biological process	protein transport; intracellular protein transport; viral process; vesicle-mediated transport; endoplasmic reticulum to Golgi vesicle-mediated transport; retrograde vesicle-mediated transport, Golgi to endoplasmic reticulum; intra-Golgi vesicle-mediated transport; neutrophil degranulation; transport
Sources:Amigo / QuickGO
Orthologs
Databases	NCBI: entry; OMA: entry
Species	Human	Mouse
Entrez	1315	70349
Ensembl	ENSG00000129083	ENSMUSG00000030754
UniProt	P53618	Q9JIF7
RefSeq (mRNA)	NM_016451; NM_001144061; NM_001144062	NM_033370
RefSeq (protein)	NP_001137533; NP_001137534; NP_057535	NP_203534
Location (UCSC)	Chr 11: 14.44 – 14.5 Mb	Chr 7: 113.81 – 113.85 Mb
PubMed search
- Wikidata
View/Edit Human	View/Edit Mouse

Coatomer subunit beta is a protein that in humans is encoded by the COPB1 gene.

== See also ==
- COPI coatomer, a protein complex
