= Neurotensin =

NTS

Identifiers
- Aliases: NTS, NMN-125, NN, NT, NT/N, NTS1, neurotensin
- External IDs: OMIM: 162650; MGI: 1328351; HomoloGene: 4506; GeneCards: NTS; OMA:NTS - orthologs
Available structures
PDB	Ortholog search: PDBe RCSB
PDB	List of PDB id codes 2LNE, 2LNF, 2LNG, 2LYW, 3F6K, 2OYV, 2OYW, 4PO7

Gene location (Human)
Chr.	Chromosome 12 (human)
Band	12q21.31	Start	85,874,295 bp
Band	12q21.31	End	85,882,992 bp

Gene location (Mouse)
Chr.	Chromosome 10 (mouse)
Band	10|10 D1	Start	102,317,617 bp
Band	10|10 D1	End	102,326,347 bp
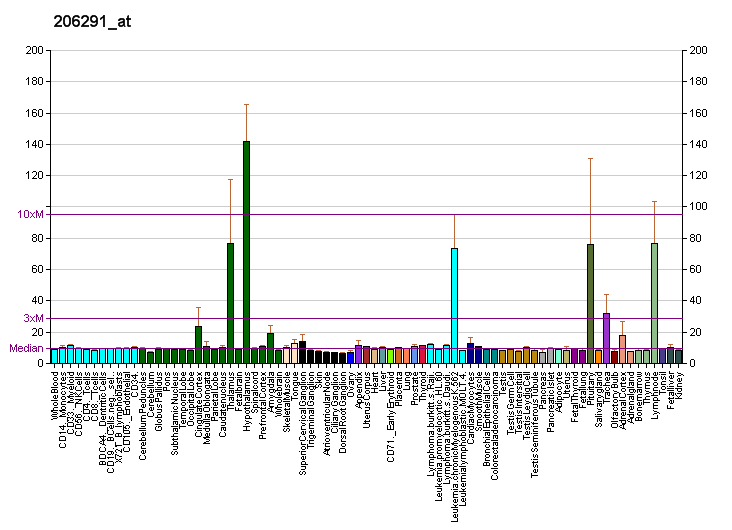
RNA expression pattern
Bgee	Human / Mouse (ortholog); Top expressed in: nasal epithelium; olfactory zone of nasal mucosa; mucosa of ileum; lateral nuclear group of thalamus; hypothalamus; epithelium of bronchus; bronchial epithelial cell; lymph node; anterior pituitary; mucosa of paranasal sinus / Top expressed in: ileum; intestinal villus; lateral hypothalamus; epithelium of small intestine; nucleus of stria terminalis; jejunum; nucleus accumbens; facial motor nucleus; lateral septal nucleus; anterior horn of spinal cord; More reference expression data
BioGPS	More reference expression data
Gene ontology
Molecular function	neuropeptide hormone activity; protein binding
Cellular component	extracellular region; transport vesicle; cytoplasmic vesicle; axon terminus
Biological process	signal transduction; regulation of signaling receptor activity; G protein-coupled receptor signaling pathway
Sources:Amigo / QuickGO
Orthologs
Species	Human	Mouse
Entrez	4922	67405
Ensembl	ENSG00000133636	ENSMUSG00000019890
UniProt	Q6FH20; P30990	Q9D3P9
RefSeq (mRNA)	NM_006183	NM_024435
RefSeq (protein)	NP_006174.1; NP_006174	NP_077755
Location (UCSC)	Chr 12: 85.87 – 85.88 Mb	Chr 10: 102.32 – 102.33 Mb
PubMed search
- Wikidata
View/Edit Human	View/Edit Mouse

Neurotensin/neuromedin N precursor

Identifiers
- Symbol: Pro-NT_NN
- Pfam: PF07421
- InterPro: IPR008055
- OPM superfamily: 257
- OPM protein: 2oyv
Available protein structures:
- PDB: IPR008055 PF07421 (ECOD; PDBsum)
- AlphaFold: IPR008055; PF07421

Neurotensin

Identifiers
CAS Number	39379-15-2
3D model (JSmol)	Interactive image
ChEBI	CHEBI:7542
ChemSpider	17290409
PubChem CID	16133836
UNII	XHB61LG5QS
- InChI: InChI=1S/C78H121N21O20/c1-7-43(6)63(73(115)96-57(76(118)119)37-42(4)5)97-70(112)55(39-45-21-25-47(101)26-22-45)95-72(114)59-18-13-35-99(59)75(117)52(16-11-33-86-78(83)84)90-64(106)48(15-10-32-85-77(81)82)89-71(113)58-17-12-34-98(58)74(116)51(14-8-9-31-79)91-69(111)56(40-60(80)102)94-66(108)50(28-30-62(104)105)88-68(110)54(38-44-19-23-46(100)24-20-44)93-67(109)53(36-41(2)3)92-65(107)49-27-29-61(103)87-49/h19-26,41-43,48-59,63,100-101H,7-18,27-40,79H2,1-6H3,(H2,80,102)(H,87,103)(H,88,110)(H,89,113)(H,90,106)(H,91,111)(H,92,107)(H,93,109)(H,94,108)(H,95,114)(H,96,115)(H,97,112)(H,104,105)(H,118,119)(H4,81,82,85)(H4,83,84,86)/t43-,48-,49-,50-,51-,52-,53-,54-,55-,56-,57-,58-,59-,63-/m0/s1 Key: PCJGZPGTCUMMOT-ISULXFBGSA-N; InChI=1/C78H121N21O20/c1-7-43(6)63(73(115)96-57(76(118)119)37-42(4)5)97-70(112)55(39-45-21-25-47(101)26-22-45)95-72(114)59-18-13-35-99(59)75(117)52(16-11-33-86-78(83)84)90-64(106)48(15-10-32-85-77(81)82)89-71(113)58-17-12-34-98(58)74(116)51(14-8-9-31-79)91-69(111)56(40-60(80)102)94-66(108)50(28-30-62(104)105)88-68(110)54(38-44-19-23-46(100)24-20-44)93-67(109)53(36-41(2)3)92-65(107)49-27-29-61(103)87-49/h19-26,41-43,48-59,63,100-101H,7-18,27-40,79H2,1-6H3,(H2,80,102)(H,87,103)(H,88,110)(H,89,113)(H,90,106)(H,91,111)(H,92,107)(H,93,109)(H,94,108)(H,95,114)(H,96,115)(H,97,112)(H,104,105)(H,118,119)(H4,81,82,85)(H4,83,84,86)/t43-,48-,49-,50-,51-,52-,53-,54-,55-,56-,57-,58-,59-,63-/m0/s1
- SMILES: CC[C@H](C)[C@@H](/C(=N/[C@@H](CC(C)C)C(=O)O)/O)/N=C(/[C@H](Cc1ccc(cc1)O)/N=C(/[C@@H]2CCCN2C(=O)[C@H](CCCNC(=N)N)/N=C(/[C@H](CCCNC(=N)N)/N=C(/[C@@H]3CCCN3C(=O)[C@H](CCCCN)/N=C(/[C@H](CC(=N)O)/N=C(/[C@H](CCC(=O)O)/N=C(/[C@H](Cc4ccc(cc4)O)/N=C(\[C@H](CC(C)C)/N=C(\[C@@H]5CCC(=N5)O)/O)/O)\O)\O)\O)\O)\O)\O)\O

Properties
Chemical formula	C_{78}H_{121}N_{21}O_{20}
Molar mass	1672.92
- Except where otherwise noted, data are given for materials in their standard state (at 25 °C [77 °F], 100 kPa). verify (what is ?) Infobox references

Neurotensin is a 13 amino acid neuropeptide that is implicated in the regulation of luteinizing hormone and prolactin release and has significant interaction with the dopaminergic system. Neurotensin was first isolated from extracts of bovine hypothalamus based on its ability to cause a visible vasodilation in the exposed cutaneous regions of anesthetized rats.

Neurotensin is distributed throughout the central nervous system, with highest levels in the hypothalamus, amygdala and nucleus accumbens. It induces a variety of effects, including analgesia, hypothermia, and increased locomotor activity. It is also involved in regulation of dopamine pathways. In the periphery, neurotensin is found in enteroendocrine cells of the small intestine, where it leads to pancreatic and biliary secretion, reduced gastric acid secretion, and smooth muscle contraction.

== Sequence and biosynthesis ==
Neurotensin shares significant sequence similarity in its 6 C-terminal amino acids with several other neuropeptides, including neuromedin N (which is derived from the same precursor). This C-terminal region is responsible for the full biological activity, the N-terminal portion having a modulatory role. The neurotensin/neuromedin N precursor can also be processed to produce large 125–138 amino acid peptides with the neurotensin or neuromedin N sequence at their C terminus. These large peptides appear to be less potent than their smaller counterparts, but are also less sensitive to degradation and may represent endogenous, long-lasting activators in a number of pathophysiological situations.

The sequence of bovine neurotensin was determined to be pyroGlu-Leu-Tyr-Glu-Asn-Lys-Pro-Arg-Arg-Pro-Tyr-Ile-Leu-OH. Neurotensin is synthesized as part of a 169 or 170 amino acid precursor protein that also contains the related neuropeptide neuromedin N. The peptide coding domains are located in tandem near the carboxyl terminal end of the precursor and are bounded and separated by paired basic amino acid (lysine-arginine) processing sites.

== Function ==
Neurotensin is involved in a variety of central and peripheral processes. In the brain, it plays a role in modulating hormone activity, social behavior, and learning. For example, neurotensin-expressing neurons in the medial preoptic area (mPOA) of mice project to the ventral tegmental area (VTA), where they contribute to social reward processing and the encoding of odor cues, suggesting a role in both hormonal signaling and reward circuits.

Neurotensin also appears to influence learning processes. In male zebra finches, expression of neurotensin and its receptor genes varies during song development. Both neurotensin and neurotensin receptor mRNA levels decrease during the transition from the sensory to sensorimotor phases of development, implicating neurotensin in the onset of sensorimotor learning. Later in development, neurotensin and neurotensin receptor 1 (Ntsr1) show complementary expression patterns in song-related brain regions, suggesting dynamic modulation of neural responses.

In a 2026 study published in PNAS, researchers demonstrated that neurotensin signaling in the extended amygdala plays a key role in maintaining exploratory or adaptive behaviors when animals are exposed to novel environments. Through targeted activation and silencing techniques, the study showed this pathway helps sustain responses beyond initial novelty detection.

In peripheral tissues, neurotensin is predominantly expressed in the gastrointestinal tract, where it participates in digestion and local signaling. Its aberrant expression has also been associated with tumorigenesis.

== Regulation ==
Neurotensin gene expression is modulated by hormonal and intracellular signaling pathways. In human SK-N-SH neuroblastoma cell cultures and in mice, estrogen has been shown to enhance neurotensin transcription through the activation of cyclic AMP (cAMP) signaling pathways. Estrogen increases cAMP levels and promotes phosphorylation of cAMP response element-binding protein (CREB), a precursor event to neurotensin gene activation. This effect is absent in knockout mice lacking the RIIβ subunit of protein kinase A, highlighting the importance of the cAMP/PKA signaling axis in neurotensin regulation. In female rats, neurotensin mRNA expression peaks in the mPOA during the proestrus phase of the estrous cycle, suggesting regulation by ovarian hormones. Postpartum hormonal states also influence neurotensin and neurotensin receptor expression. In postpartum female mice, neurotensin levels were increased in the paraventricular nucleus (PVN) of the hypothalamus despite reduced Ntsr1 mRNA. Both neurotensin mRNA and peptide levels were elevated in the mPOA, changes that were absent in virgin controls. These patterns are consistent with a regulatory role in maternal behaviors.

== Clinical significance ==
Aberrant neurotensin signaling has been implicated in several pathological conditions, particularly in cancer. In colorectal cancer cells, expression of neurotensin receptor genes (NTSR1 and NTSR2) is regulated by promoter DNA methylation. Downregulation of NTSR1 through RNA interference or pharmacological antagonism results in reduced cell proliferation and migration, indicating a tumor-promoting role for this pathway. Neurotensin expression has also been observed in leiomyomas, or fibroid tumors, of the uterus. Both neurotensin and NTSR1 levels are elevated in fibroid tissues compared to normal uterine tissue, suggesting a role in the pathophysiology of uterine smooth muscle proliferation.

Neurotensin is a potent mitogen for colorectal cancer.

Neurotensin has been implicated in the modulation of dopamine signaling, and produces a spectrum of pharmacological effects resembling those of antipsychotic drugs, leading to the suggestion that neurotensin may be an endogenous neuroleptic. Neurotensin-deficient mice display defects in responses to several antipsychotic drugs consistent with the idea that neurotensin signaling is a key component underlying at least some antipsychotic drug actions. These mice exhibit modest defects in prepulse inhibition (PPI) of the startle reflex, a model that has been widely used to investigate antipsychotic drug action in animals. Antipsychotic drug administration augments PPI under certain conditions. Comparisons between normal and neurotensin-deficient mice revealed striking differences in the ability of different antipsychotic drugs to augment PPI. While the atypical antipsychotic drug clozapine augmented PPI normally in neurotensin-deficient mice, the conventional antipsychotic haloperidol and the newer atypical antipsychotic quetiapine were ineffective in these mice, in contrast to normal mice where these drugs significantly augmented PPI. These results suggest that certain antipsychotic drugs require neurotensin for at least some of their effects. Neurotensin-deficient mice also display defects in striatal activation following haloperidol, but not clozapine administration in comparison to normal wild type mice, indicating that striatal neurotensin is required for the full spectrum of neuronal responses to a subset of antipsychotic drugs.

Neurotensin is an endogenous neuropeptide involved in thermoregulation that can induce hypothermia and neuroprotection in experimental models of cerebral ischemia.

== See also ==
- Neurotensin receptor
