= Neuropeptide VF precursor =

NPVF

Identifiers
- Aliases: NPVF, C7orf9, RFRP, neuropeptide VF precursor
- External IDs: OMIM: 616984; MGI: 1926488; GeneCards: NPVF

Gene location (Human)
Chr.	Chromosome 7 (human)
Band	7p15.3	Start	25,224,570 bp
Band	7p15.3	End	25,228,486 bp

Gene location (Mouse)
Chr.	Chromosome 6 (mouse)
Band	6|6 B2.3	Start	50,627,652 bp
Band	6|6 B2.3	End	50,631,419 bp
RNA expression pattern
Bgee	Human / Mouse (ortholog); Top expressed in: hypothalamus; eyeball; retina; retinal pigment epithelium; pharynx; cerebral hemisphere; nucleus accumbens; gland; endocrine system; tonsil / Top expressed in: dorsomedial hypothalamic nucleus; lumbar subsegment of spinal cord; embryo; ventromedial nucleus; iris; ventral tegmental area; knee joint; paraventricular nucleus of hypothalamus; neck; medial ganglionic eminence; More reference expression data
BioGPS	n/a
Orthologs
Databases	NCBI: entry; OMA: entry
Species	Human	Mouse
Entrez	64111	60531
Ensembl	ENSG00000105954	ENSMUSG00000029831
UniProt	Q9HCQ7	Q9ESQ8
RefSeq (mRNA)	NM_022150	NM_021892
RefSeq (protein)	NP_071433	NP_068692
Location (UCSC)	Chr 7: 25.22 – 25.23 Mb	Chr 6: 50.63 – 50.63 Mb
PubMed search
- Wikidata
View/Edit Human	View/Edit Mouse

Neuropeptide VF precursor, also known as pro-FMRFamide-related neuropeptide VF or RFamide-related peptide precursor, is a propeptide that in mammals is encoded by the NPVF (or RPFP) gene. The NPVF gene, and thus the propeptide, are expressed in neurons in the mediobasal hypothalamus. The propeptide is cleaved to form three other peptides, which are:

- Neuropeptide SF (NPSF) (RFRP-1) – agonist of the NPFF_{1} and NPFF_{2} receptors (EC_{50} = 29 nM and 0.0011 nM, respectively)
- RFRP-2 – does not bind to either of the NPFF receptors; no known biological activity
- Neuropeptide VF (NPVF) (RFRP-3) – agonist of the NPFF_{1} receptor (IC_{50} = 0.7 nM)

NPSF and NPVF, originally referred to as the RFamide-related peptides RFRP-1 and RFRP-3, respectively, are the mammalian homologs of the avian neuropeptide gonadotropin-inhibitory hormone (GnIH). The mammalian NPVF and avian GnIH genes, along with their aforementioned peptide products, were discovered concurrently in 2000. Similarly to the avian GnIH neuropeptide, NPSF and NPVF have been found to potently inhibit gonadotropin secretion. Moreover, a potent and selective antagonist of the NPFF receptors, RF9, has been reported to possess "very strong" gonadotropin-releasing effects in vivo in male and female mice.

== See also ==
- Neuropeptide FF
- FMRFamide
- Gonadotropin-releasing hormone
- Gonadotropin-inhibitory hormone
- Gonadotropin release inhibitor
- Kisspeptin
