= RF3286 =

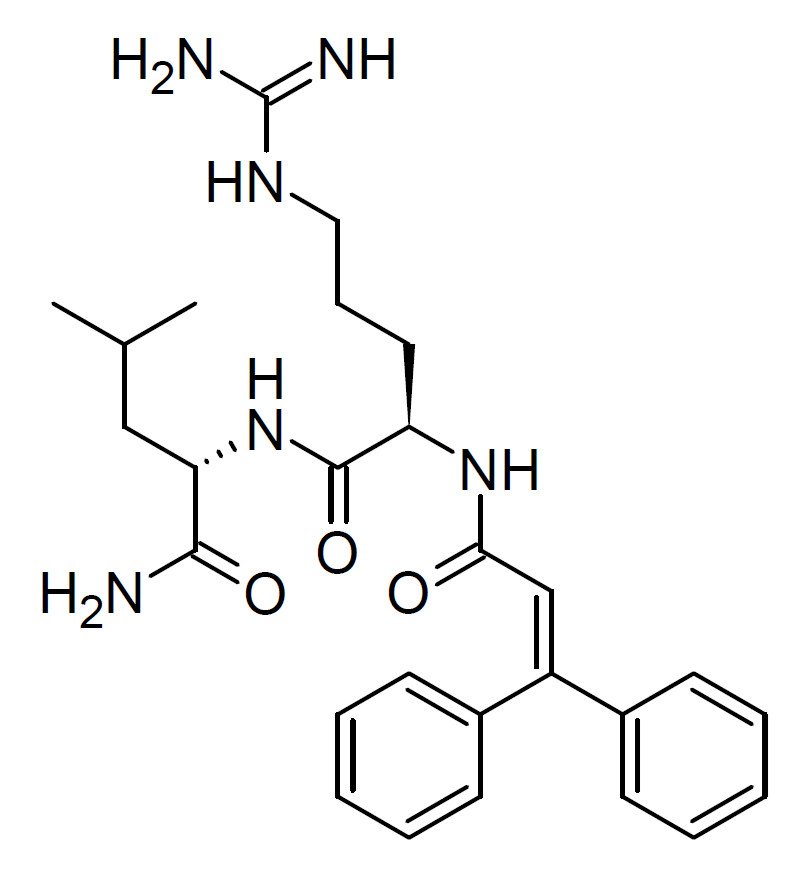

Identifiers
- IUPAC name: (2S)-2-[[(2R)-5-(diaminomethylideneamino)-2-(3,3-diphenylprop-2-enoylamino)pentanoyl]amino]-4-methylpentanamide
- PubChem CID: 166631924
- ChemSpider: 129298592
- ChEMBL: ChEMBL5085324

Chemical and physical data
- Formula: C_{27}H_{36}N_{6}O_{3}
- Molar mass: 492.624 g·mol^{−1}
- 3D model (JSmol): Interactive image
- SMILES: CC(C)C[C@@H](C(=O)N)NC(=O)[C@@H](CCCN=C(N)N)NC(=O)C=C(C1=CC=CC=C1)C2=CC=CC=C2
- InChI: InChI=1S/C27H36N6O3/c1-18(2)16-23(25(28)35)33-26(36)22(14-9-15-31-27(29)30)32-24(34)17-21(19-10-5-3-6-11-19)20-12-7-4-8-13-20/h3-8,10-13,17-18,22-23H,9,14-16H2,1-2H3,(H2,28,35)(H,32,34)(H,33,36)(H4,29,30,31)/t22-,23+/m1/s1; Key:DHCKIFBNEHPVAG-PKTZIBPZSA-N

RF3286 is a drug used in scientific research which acts as a potent and selective antagonist for the neuropeptide FF receptor NPFF1. Unlike the older compound RF9 it shows good selectivity over the closely related NPFF2 subtype, as well as over other related receptor targets such as neuropeptide Y receptors. In animal studies, RF3286 potently inhibited the development of hyperalgesia produced by mu-opioid agonists while also increasing analgesia.
