= CI5 (peptide) =

Chemical and physical data
- Formula: C_{43}H_{69}N_{13}O_{11}
- Molar mass: 944.105 g·mol^{−1}
- 3D model (JSmol): Interactive image
- SMILES: O=C(O)[C@@H](NC(=O)CNC(=O)[C@@H](NC(=O)[C@@H]1CCCN1C(=O)[C@@H](NC(=O)[C@@H](NC(=O)[C@@H](NC(=O)CNC(=O)[C@H](C)N)CC(C)C)CCC(=O)N)Cc1ccccc1)C(C)C)CCCNC(N)=N
- InChI: InChI=InChI=1S/C43H69N13O11/c1-23(2)19-29(52-34(59)21-49-36(60)25(5)44)38(62)53-27(15-16-32(45)57)37(61)54-30(20-26-11-7-6-8-12-26)41(65)56-18-10-14-31(56)39(63)55-35(24(3)4)40(64)50-22-33(58)51-28(42(66)67)13-9-17-48-43(46)47/h6-8,11-12,23-25,27-31,35H,9-10,13-22,44H2,1-5H3,(H2,45,57)(H,49,60)(H,50,64)(H,51,58)(H,52,59)(H,53,62)(H,54,61)(H,55,63)(H,66,67)(H4,46,47,48)/t25-,27-,28-,29-,30-,31-,35-/m0/s1; Key:XZUQAJADLIAOAC-UYSGMIOUSA-N

CI5 is a polypeptide 9 amino acids in length, with the sequence AGLQFPVGR or Ala-Gly-Leu-Gln-Phe-Pro-Val-Gly-Arg. It was derived from the skin secretions of the toad Bufo gargarizans, which are used in various forms in Traditional Chinese medicine under the name 华蟾素 (Huachansu). Fractionation and testing of the components of Bufo gargarizans skin secretions identified CI5 as the most active analgesic component, and it was found to act as a modulator of the RAC2 protein and an indirect COX inhibitor which also inhibits production of inflammatory mediators such as IL-6, TNF-α and IL-1β. It has antiinflammatory and analgesic effects in animal studies, and has been suggested as a novel analgesic derived from traditional Chinese medicine.

== See also ==
- AL-VI10
- Conantokin G
- (Dmt1)DALDA
- H-20 (peptide)
- KGOP01
- RVD-Hpα
- Xiyanping
- Ziconotide
