= KGOP01 =

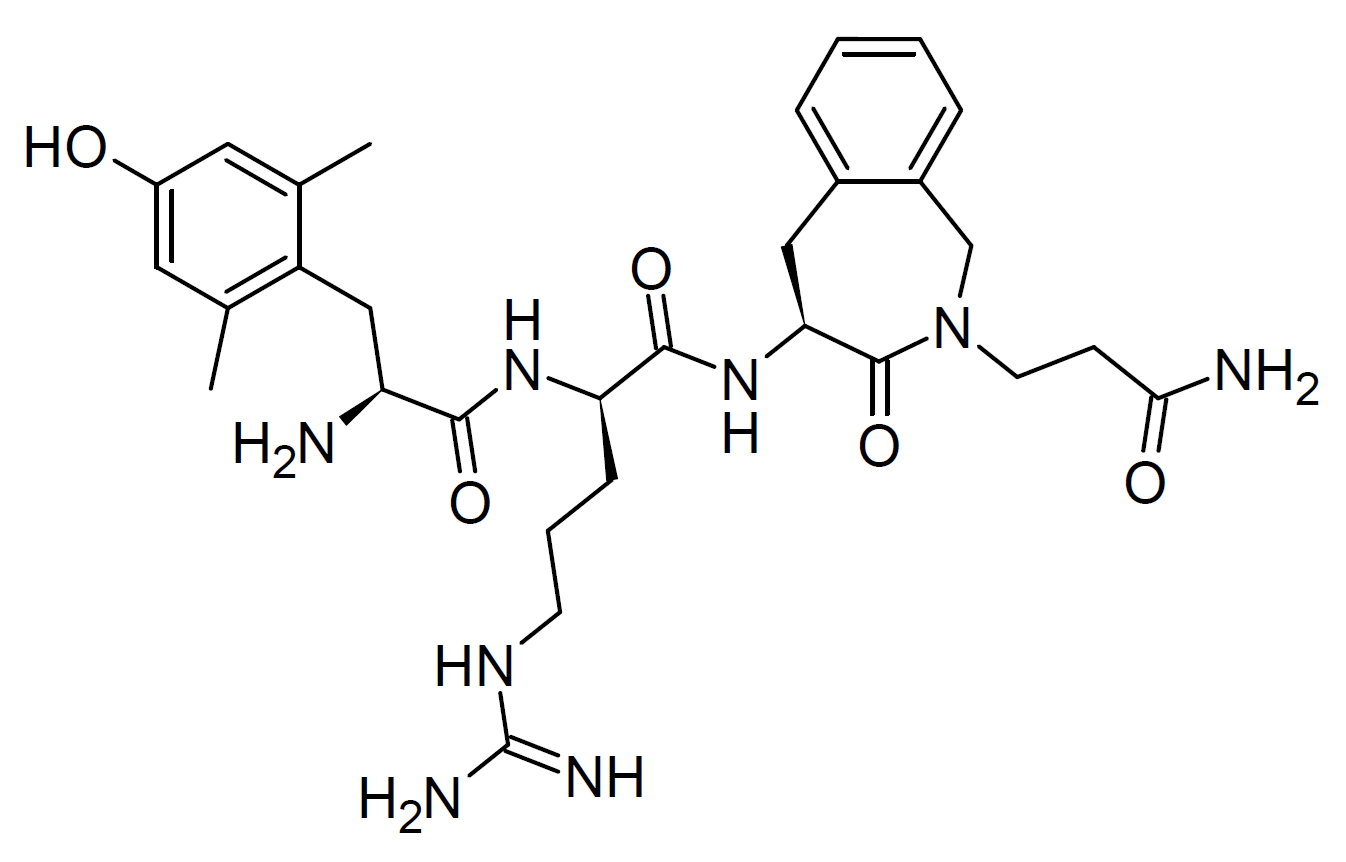

Clinical data
- Other names: 2,6-Dimethyl-L-tyrosyl-N-[(4S)-2-(3-amino-3-oxopropyl)-3-oxo-2,3,4,5-tetrahydro-1H-2-benzazepin-4-yl]-D-argininamide

Identifiers
- IUPAC name: (2R)-2-[[(2S)-2-amino-3-(4-hydroxy-2,6-dimethylphenyl)propanoyl]amino]-N-[(4S)-2-(3-amino-3-oxopropyl)-3-oxo-4,5-dihydro-1H-2-benzazepin-4-yl]-5-(diaminomethylideneamino)pentanamide
- PubChem CID: 118731120
- ChemSpider: 58988148
- ChEMBL: ChEMBL3408737

Chemical and physical data
- Formula: C_{30}H_{42}N_{8}O_{5}
- Molar mass: 594.717 g·mol^{−1}
- 3D model (JSmol): Interactive image
- SMILES: CC1=CC(=CC(=C1C[C@@H](C(=O)N[C@H](CCCN=C(N)N)C(=O)N[C@H]2CC3=CC=CC=C3CN(C2=O)CCC(=O)N)N)C)O
- InChI: InChI=1S/C30H42N8O5/c1-17-12-21(39)13-18(2)22(17)15-23(31)27(41)36-24(8-5-10-35-30(33)34)28(42)37-25-14-19-6-3-4-7-20(19)16-38(29(25)43)11-9-26(32)40/h3-4,6-7,12-13,23-25,39H,5,8-11,14-16,31H2,1-2H3,(H2,32,40)(H,36,41)(H,37,42)(H4,33,34,35)/t23-,24+,25-/m0/s1; Key:VBTIGXSUDIFYPI-GVAUOCQISA-N

KGOP01 (H-Dmt-d-Arg-Aba-β-Ala-NH2) is a synthetic peptide derivative which acts as a potent agonist of opioid receptors and has analgesic effects. It is a modified derivative of (Dmt1)DALDA, which was in turn originally derived from modification of dermorphin, a naturally occurring opioid peptide secreted by some species of South American frogs.

While numerous opioid peptides are known and widely used in scientific research, such as DAMGO and DADLE, these are rapidly metabolised in the body and fail to cross the blood-brain barrier, and so do not produce centrally mediated analgesic effects. KGOP01 on the other hand contains several unnatural amino acids and is both metabolically stable and able to enter the brain, resulting in potent analgesic effects in animal studies.

Because it is a peptide, it can be readily hybridised with other peptide ligands and so has been widely used to produce hybrid compounds combining opioid activity with activity at receptors for neuropeptides such as nociceptin, neurokinin, neurotensin and neuropeptide FF, which may lead to the development of improved opioid analgesics with reduced side effects.

== See also ==
- Adrenorphin
- CI5 (peptide)
- Conantokin G
- DALDA
- H-20 (peptide)
- RVD-Hpα
- Ziconotide
