= Neuropeptide FF receptor =

InterPro Family

neuropeptide FF receptor 1

Identifiers
- Symbol: NPFFR1
- Alt. symbols: GPR147
- NCBI gene: 64106
- HGNC: 17425
- OMIM: 607448
- RefSeq: NM_022146
- UniProt: Q9GZQ6

Other data
- Locus: Chr. 10 q21-q22
Search for
- Structures: Swiss-model
- Domains: InterPro

neuropeptide FF receptor 2

Identifiers
- Symbol: NPFFR2
- Alt. symbols: GPR74
- NCBI gene: 10886
- HGNC: 4525
- OMIM: 607449
- RefSeq: NM_004885
- UniProt: Q9Y5X5

Other data
- Locus: Chr. 4 q21
Search for
- Structures: Swiss-model
- Domains: InterPro

The neuropeptide FF receptors are members of the G-protein coupled receptor superfamily of integral membrane proteins which bind the pain modulatory neuropeptides AF and FF.

The Neuropeptide FF receptor family is a member of the G protein-coupled receptor superfamily containing two subtypes, NPFF1 and NPFF2, which exhibit a high affinity for Neuropeptide FF (NPFF) peptides. NPFF1 is broadly distributed in the central nervous system with the highest levels found in the limbic system and the hypothalamus. NPFF2 is present in high density, particularly in mammals in the superficial layers of the spinal cord where it is involved in nociception and modulation of opioid functions. These receptors participate to the modulation of opioid receptor function in the brain and spinal cord, and can either reduce or increase opioid receptor function depending which tissue they are released in, reflecting a complex role for neuropeptide FF in pain responses.

NPFF receptors are coupled to G proteins and regulate adenylyl cyclase in recombinant cell lines (CHO, HEK 293, SH-SY5Y). NPFF receptors are also coupled to voltage-gated N-type Ca2+ channels.

== Ligands ==
=== Agonists ===
- Neuropeptide AF
- Neuropeptide FF - similar high affinity at both NPFF1 and NPFF2
- Neuropeptide SF (RFRP-1)
- Gonadotropin-inhibitory hormone (Neuropeptide VF / RFRP-3) - selective for NPFF1 over NPFF2
- Prolactin-releasing peptide (PrRP) - endogenous agonist for GPR10 but also agonist at NPFF2 with only weak activity at NPFF1
- Kisspeptins - endogenous agonist for GPR54 but longer chain versions are also agonists at NPFF1 and NPFF2.
- AC-263093 - synthetic small molecule agonist at NPFF2 but antagonist at NPFF1

=== Antagonists ===
- BIBP-3226 (mixed NPFF_{1} / NPY_{1} antagonist)
- RF9
- RF3286 (highly selective for NPFF1 over NPFF2)
- Hederagenin (natural product, selective for NPFF1)
- MES207 (17x selective for NPFF1 over NPFF2)

== See also ==
- RFamide peptide family
