= AC-263093 =

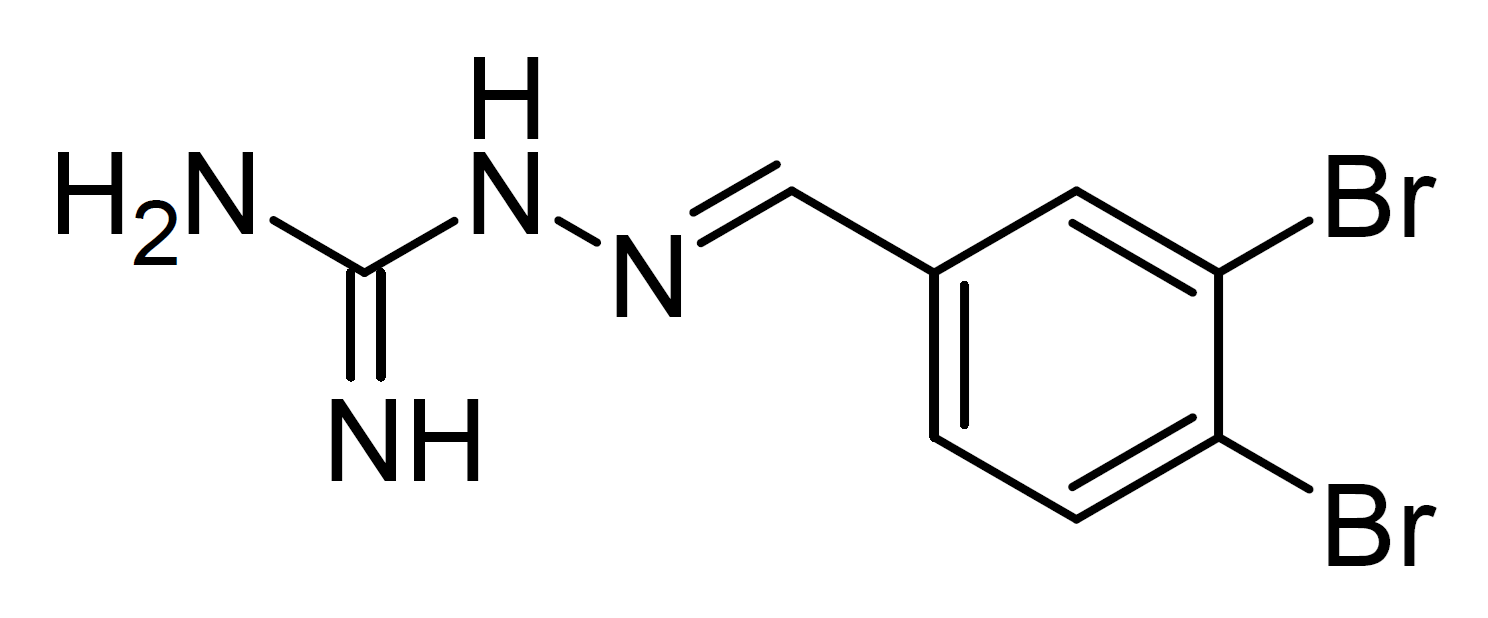

Identifiers
- IUPAC name: 2-[(E)-(3,4-dibromophenyl)methylideneamino]guanidine
- CAS Number: 849459-86-5
- PubChem CID: 44542176
- ChemSpider: 24636697
- ChEMBL: ChEMBL573297

Chemical and physical data
- Formula: C_{8}H_{8}Br_{2}N_{4}
- Molar mass: 319.988 g·mol^{−1}
- 3D model (JSmol): Interactive image
- SMILES: C1=CC(=C(C=C1/C=N/N=C(N)N)Br)Br
- InChI: InChI=1S/C8H8Br2N4/c9-6-2-1-5(3-7(6)10)4-13-14-8(11)12/h1-4H,(H4,11,12,14)/b13-4+; Key:VMYFCUKMGMFQNH-YIXHJXPBSA-N

AC-263093 is a drug used in scientific research which acts as an agonist at the neuropeptide FF receptor NPFF2 and an antagonist for the closely related NPFF1 receptor. In animal studies it reduced tolerance to morphine but also produced hyperalgesia and anxiety. Related compounds such as AC-099 with Cl or CF3 replacing the bromine substituents have similar activity as NPFF2 agonists or partial agonists but with relatively lower potency.
