= Alternative cancer treatments =

Alternative or complementary treatments for cancer that have not demonstrated efficacy

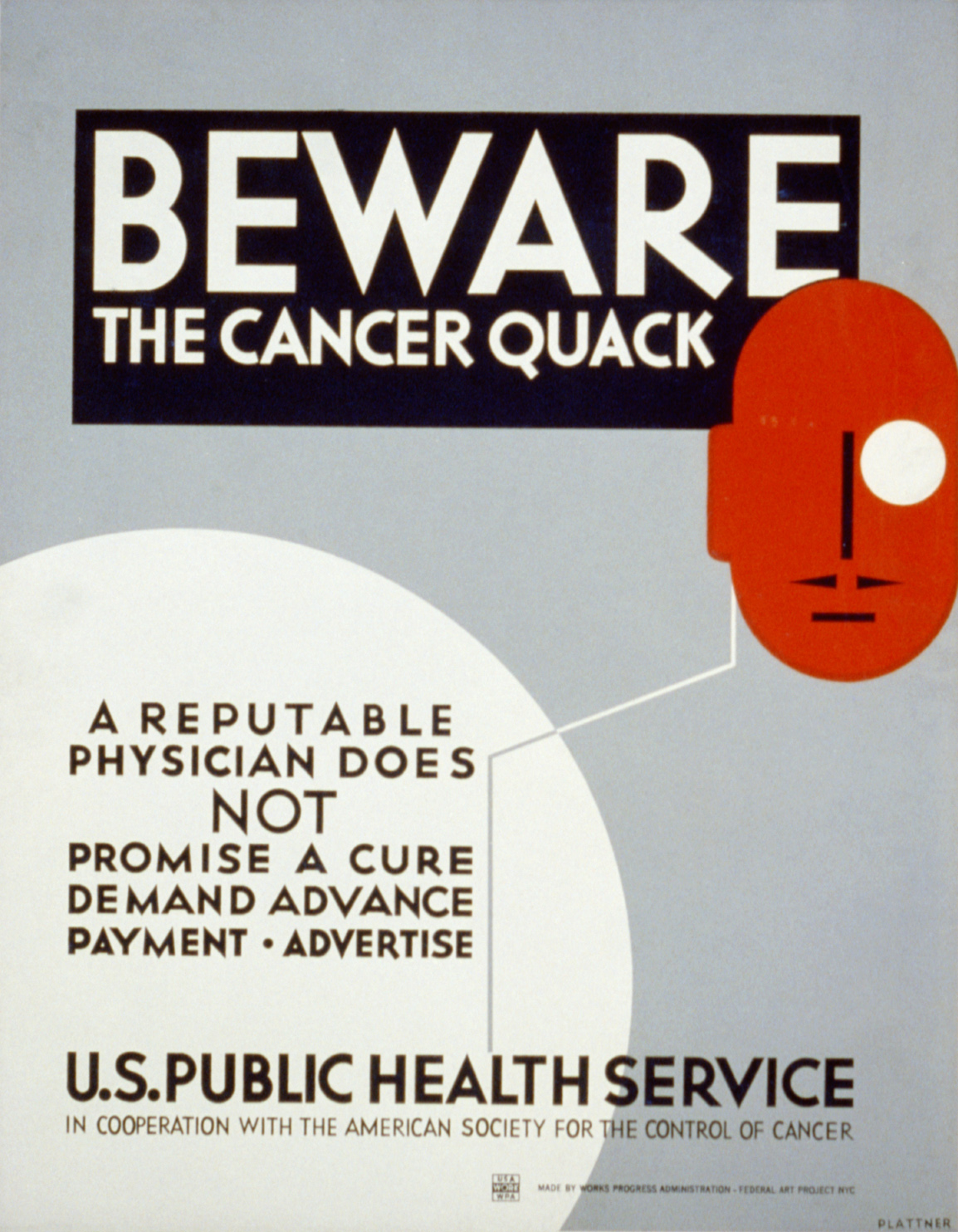
1930s public information poster warning of "cancer quacks"

Alternative cancer treatment describes any cancer treatment or practice that is not part of the conventional standard of cancer care. These include special diets and exercises, chemicals, herbs, devices, and manual procedures. Most alternative cancer treatments do not have high-quality evidence supporting their use and many have been described as fundamentally pseudoscientific. Concerns have been raised about the safety of some purported treatments, and some have been found unsafe in clinical trials. Despite this, many untested and disproven treatments are used around the world.

Alternative cancer treatments are typically contrasted with experimental cancer treatments – science-based treatment methods – and complementary treatments, which are non-invasive practices used in combination with conventional treatment. All approved chemotherapy medications were considered experimental treatments before completing safety and efficacy testing.

Since the late 19th century, medical researchers have established modern cancer care through the development of chemotherapy, radiation therapy, targeted therapies, and refined surgical techniques. As of 2019, only 32.9% of cancer patients in the United States died within five years of their diagnosis. Despite their effectiveness, many conventional treatments are accompanied by a wide range of side effects, including pain, fatigue, and nausea. Some side effects can even be life-threatening. Many supporters of alternative treatments claim increased effectiveness and decreased side effects when compared to conventional treatments. However, one retrospective cohort study showed that patients using alternative treatments instead of conventional treatments were 2.5 times more likely to die within five years.

Most alternative cancer treatments have not been tested in proper clinical trials. Among studies that have been published, the quality is often poor. A 2006 review of 196 clinical trials that studied unconventional cancer treatments found a lack of early-phase testing, little rationale for dosing regimens, and poor statistical analyses. These treatments have appeared and vanished throughout history.

== Terminology ==
Complementary and alternative cancer treatments are often grouped, in part because of the adoption of the phrase complementary and alternative medicine by the United States Congress. The World Health Organization uses the phrase traditional, complementary, and integrative medicine (TCIM) to describe a similar set of treatments.

Complementary treatments are used in conjunction with proven mainstream treatments. They tend to be pleasant for the patient, not involve substances with any pharmacological effects, inexpensive, and intended to treat side effects rather than to kill cancer cells. Medical massage and self-hypnosis to treat pain are examples of complementary treatments.

About half the practitioners who dispense complementary treatments are physicians, although they tend to be generalists rather than oncologists. As many as 60% of American physicians have referred their patients to a complementary practitioner for some purpose. While conventional physicians should always be kept aware of any complementary treatments used by a patient, many physicians in the United Kingdom are at least tolerant of their use, and some might recommend them.

Alternative treatments, by contrast, are used in place of mainstream treatments. The most popular alternative cancer therapies include restrictive diets, mind-body interventions, bioelectromagnetics, nutritional supplements, and herbs. The popularity and prevalence of different treatments varies widely by region. Cancer Research UK warns that alternative treatments may interact with conventional treatment, may increase the side effects of medication, and can give people false hope.

== Prevalence ==
Survey data about how many cancer patients use alternative or complementary therapies vary from nation to nation as well as from region to region. Reliance on alternative therapies is common in developing countries because people cannot afford effective medical treatment. For example, in Latin America, most cancer patients have used natural products, nutritional supplements, and spiritual practices (such as praying) in addition to, or instead of, medical care. In Africa, where millions of people do not have financial or geographical access to an oncologist, many Africans with cancer rely on traditional African medicine, which uses divination, spiritualism, and herbal medicine. About 40% of African cancer patients take herbal preparations. Three-quarters of Chinese people with cancer use some form of Traditional Chinese medicine, especially Chinese herbal preparations. About a third of people with cancer in India use Ayurveda or other elements of AYUSH.

A 2000 study published by the European Journal of Cancer evaluated a sample of 1023 women from a British cancer registry who had breast cancer and found that 22.4% had consulted with a practitioner of complementary therapies in the previous twelve months. The study concluded that the patients had spent many thousands of pounds on such measures and that use "of practitioners of complementary therapies following diagnosis is a significant and possibly growing phenomenon".

In Australia, one study reported that 46% of children with cancer have been treated with at least one non-traditional therapy. Further, 40% of those of any age receiving palliative care had tried at least one such therapy. Some of the most popular alternative cancer treatments were found to be dietary therapies, antioxidants, high dose vitamins, and herbal therapies.

In the United States, nearly all adults who use non-conventional medical therapies do so in addition to conventional medical treatment, rather than as an alternative to it. Use of unconventional cancer treatments in the United States has been influenced by the U.S. federal government's National Center for Complementary and Alternative Medicine (NCCAM), initially known as the Office of Alternative Medicine (OAM), which was established in 1992 as a National Institutes of Health (NIH) adjunct by the U.S. Congress. More specifically, the NIC's Office of Cancer Complementary and Alternative Medicine sponsors over $105 million a year in grants for pseudoscientific cancer research. Over thirty American medical schools have offered general courses in alternative medicine, including the Georgetown, Columbia, and Harvard university systems, among others.

== People who choose alternative treatments ==
People drawn to alternative treatments tend to believe that evidence-based medicine is invasive or ineffective, while still hoping that their health could be improved. They are loyal to their alternative healthcare providers and believe that "treatment should concentrate on the whole person". Among people who (correctly or incorrectly) believe their condition is untreatable, "desperation drives them into the hands of anyone with a promise and a smile." Con artists have long exploited patients' perceived lack of options to extract payments for ineffectual and even harmful treatments.

No evidence suggests that the use of alternative treatments improves survival. In 2017, one retrospective, observational study suggested that people who chose alternative medicine instead of conventional treatments were more than twice as likely to die within five years of diagnosis. Breast cancer patients choosing alternative medicine were 5.68 times more likely to die within five years of diagnosis.

Although they are more likely to die than non-users, some users of alternative treatments feel a greater sense of control over their destinies and report less anxiety and depression. They are more likely to engage in benefit finding, which is the psychological process of adapting to a traumatic situation and deciding that the trauma was valuable, usually because of perceived personal and spiritual growth during the crisis.

In a survey of American cancer patients, baby boomers were more likely to support complementary and alternative treatments than people from an older generation. White, female, college-educated patients who had been diagnosed more than a year ago were more likely than others to report a favorable impression of at least some complementary and alternative benefits.

== Unproven and disproven treatments ==
Many therapies without evidence have been promoted to treat or prevent cancer in humans. In many cases, evidence suggests that the treatments do not work. Unlike accepted cancer treatments, unproven and disproven treatments are generally ignored or avoided by the medical community.

Despite this, many of these therapies have continued to be promoted as effective, particularly by promoters of alternative medicine. Scientists consider this practice quackery, and some of those engaged in it have been investigated and prosecuted by public health regulators such as the US Federal Trade Commission, the Mexican Secretariat of Health and the Canadian Competition Bureau. In the United Kingdom, the Cancer Act makes the unauthorized promotion of cancer treatments a criminal offense.

In 2008, the United States Federal Trade Commission acted against some companies that made unsupported claims that their products, some of which included highly toxic chemicals, could cure cancer. Targets included Omega Supply, Native Essence Herb Company, Daniel Chapter One, Gemtronics, Inc., Herbs for Cancer, Nu-Gen Nutrition, Inc., Westberry Enterprises, Inc., Jim Clark's All Natural Cancer Therapy, Bioque Technologies, Cleansing Time Pro, and Premium-essiac-tea-4less.

== Areas of research ==
=== Specific methods ===
- Curcumin is a component of turmeric. It is under preliminary research for therapeutic potential, but according to Cancer Research UK no reputable organization supports claims that it can "cure" cancer.
- Psilocybin is a psychedelic compound found in more than 100 mushroom species. Three small trials have demonstrated decreased cancer-related psychiatric distress, including anxiety and depression with its use.
- HuaChanSu, traditional Chinese medicine derived from the parotoid gland secretion of toads of the genus Bufo.
- Medical cannabis (for "appetite stimulation" and "pain")
- Selenium

=== Pain relief ===
Most studies of complementary and alternative medicine in the treatment of cancer pain are of low quality in terms of scientific evidence. Studies of massage therapy have produced mixed results, but overall show some temporary benefit for reducing pain, anxiety, and depression and a very low risk of harm, unless the patient is at risk for bleeding disorders. There is weak evidence for a modest benefit from hypnosis, supportive psychotherapy and cognitive therapy. Results about Reiki and touch therapy were inconclusive. The most studied such treatment, acupuncture, has demonstrated no benefit as an adjunct analgesic in cancer pain. The evidence for music therapy is equivocal, and some herbal interventions such as PC-SPES, mistletoe, and saw palmetto are known to be toxic to some cancer patients. The most promising evidence, though still weak, is for mind–body interventions such as biofeedback and relaxation techniques.

== Examples of complementary therapy ==
As stated in the scientific literature, the measures listed below are defined as 'complementary' because they are applied in conjunction with mainstream anti-cancer measures such as chemotherapy, in contrast to the ineffective therapies viewed as 'alternative' since they are offered as substitutes for mainstream measures.

- Acupuncture may help with nausea but does not treat the disease. A 2015 Cochrane review found unclear usefulness for cancer pain, though other reviews have found tentative evidence of benefit. It is of unclear effect in hot flashes in people with breast cancer.
- The effects of aromatherapy are unclear, with no peer-reviewed research in regards to cancer treatment.
- Psychotherapy may reduce anxiety and improve quality of life as well as allow for improving patient moods.
- Massage therapy may temporarily reduce pain.
- There is no evidence that cannabis has a beneficial effect in preventing or treating cancer in humans.
- Hypnosis and meditation may improve the quality of life of cancer patients.
- Music therapy eases cancer-related symptoms by helping with mood disturbances.

== Alternative theories of cancer ==
Some alternative cancer treatments are based on unproven or disproven theories of how cancer begins or is sustained in the body. Some common concepts are:

=== Mind-body connection ===
This idea says that cancer progression is related to a person's mental and emotional state. Treatments based on this idea are mind–body interventions. Proponents say that cancer forms because the person is unhappy or stressed, or that a positive attitude can cure cancer after it has formed. A typical claim is that stress, anger, fear, or sadness depresses the immune system, whereas love, forgiveness, confidence, and happiness cause the immune system to improve, and that this improved immune system will destroy the cancer. This belief that generally boosting the immune system's activity will kill the cancer cells is not supported by any scientific research. In fact, many cancers require the support of an active immune system (especially through inflammation) to establish the tumor microenvironment necessary for a tumor to grow.

=== Toxin theory of cancer ===
In this idea, the body's metabolic processes are overwhelmed by normal byproducts. These byproducts, called "toxins", are said to build up in the cells and cause cancer and other diseases through a process sometimes called autointoxication or autotoxemia. Treatments following this approach are usually aimed at detoxification or body cleansing, such as enemas.

=== Low activity by the immune system ===
This claim asserts that if only the body's immune system were strong enough, it would kill the "invading" or "foreign" cancer. Unfortunately, most cancer cells retain normal cell characteristics, making them appear to the immune system to be a normal part of the body. Cancerous tumors also actively induce immune tolerance, which prevents the immune system from attacking them.

=== Epigenetic disregulation ===
This claim uses research into the mechanism of epigenetics to understand how mutations in the epigenetic machinery of cells will alter histone acetylation patterns to create cancer epigenetics. DNA damage appears to be the primary underlying cause of cancer. If DNA repair is deficient, DNA damage tends to accumulate. Such excess DNA damage can increase mutational errors during DNA replication due to error-prone translesion synthesis. Excess DNA damage can also increase epigenetic alterations due to errors during DNA repair. Such mutations and epigenetic alterations can give rise to cancer.

== See also ==
- Diet and cancer
- Clinical trial
- Placebo effect
- List of topics characterized as pseudoscience
- The Truth About Cancer
