= MES207 =

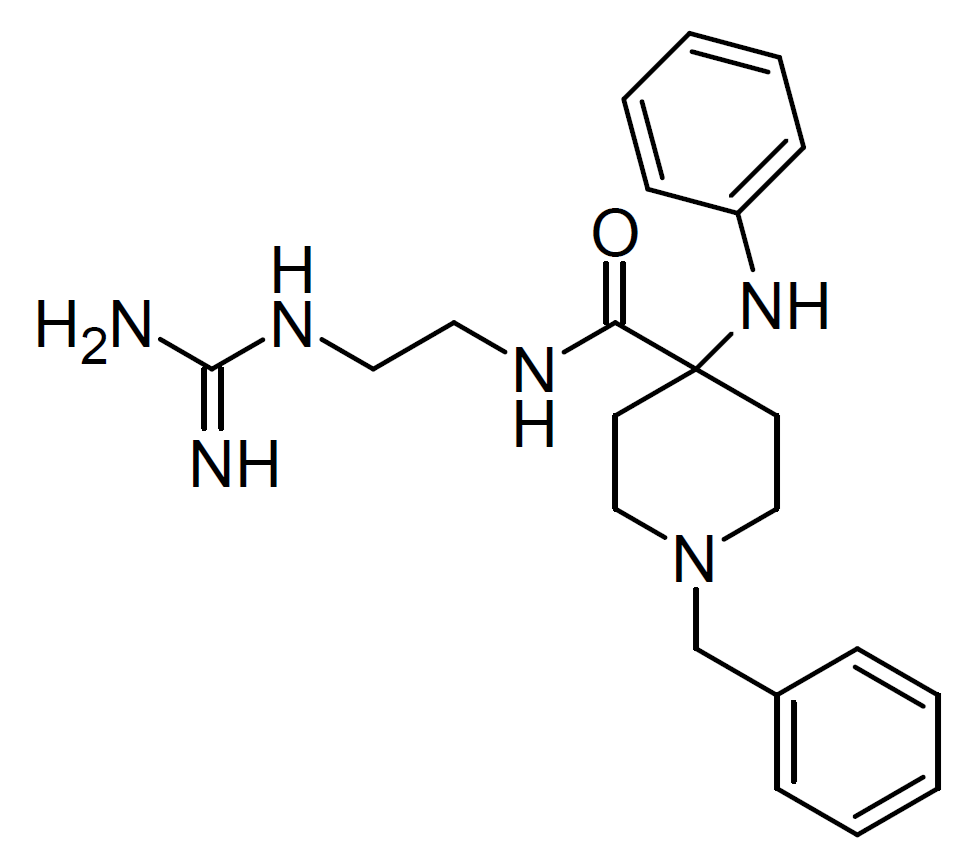

Identifiers
- IUPAC name: 4-anilino-1-benzyl-N-[2-(diaminomethylideneamino)ethyl]piperidine-4-carboxamide
- PubChem CID: 101882819
- IUPHAR/BPS: 11235
- ChemSpider: 58129784
- ChEMBL: ChEMBL3361425

Chemical and physical data
- Formula: C_{22}H_{30}N_{6}O
- Molar mass: 394.523 g·mol^{−1}
- 3D model (JSmol): Interactive image
- SMILES: C1CN(CCC1(C(=O)NCCN=C(N)N)NC2=CC=CC=C2)CC3=CC=CC=C3
- InChI: InChI=1S/C22H30N6O/c23-21(24)26-14-13-25-20(29)22(27-19-9-5-2-6-10-19)11-15-28(16-12-22)17-18-7-3-1-4-8-18/h1-10,27H,11-17H2,(H,25,29)(H4,23,24,26); Key:SCPYAGLHLAAYFP-UHFFFAOYSA-N

MES207 is a drug used in scientific research which acts as a potent and selective antagonist for the neuropeptide FF receptor NPFF1, with 17x selectivity over the closely related receptor NPFF2. It prevented opioid-induced hyperalgesia in animal models.
