= Conantokin G =

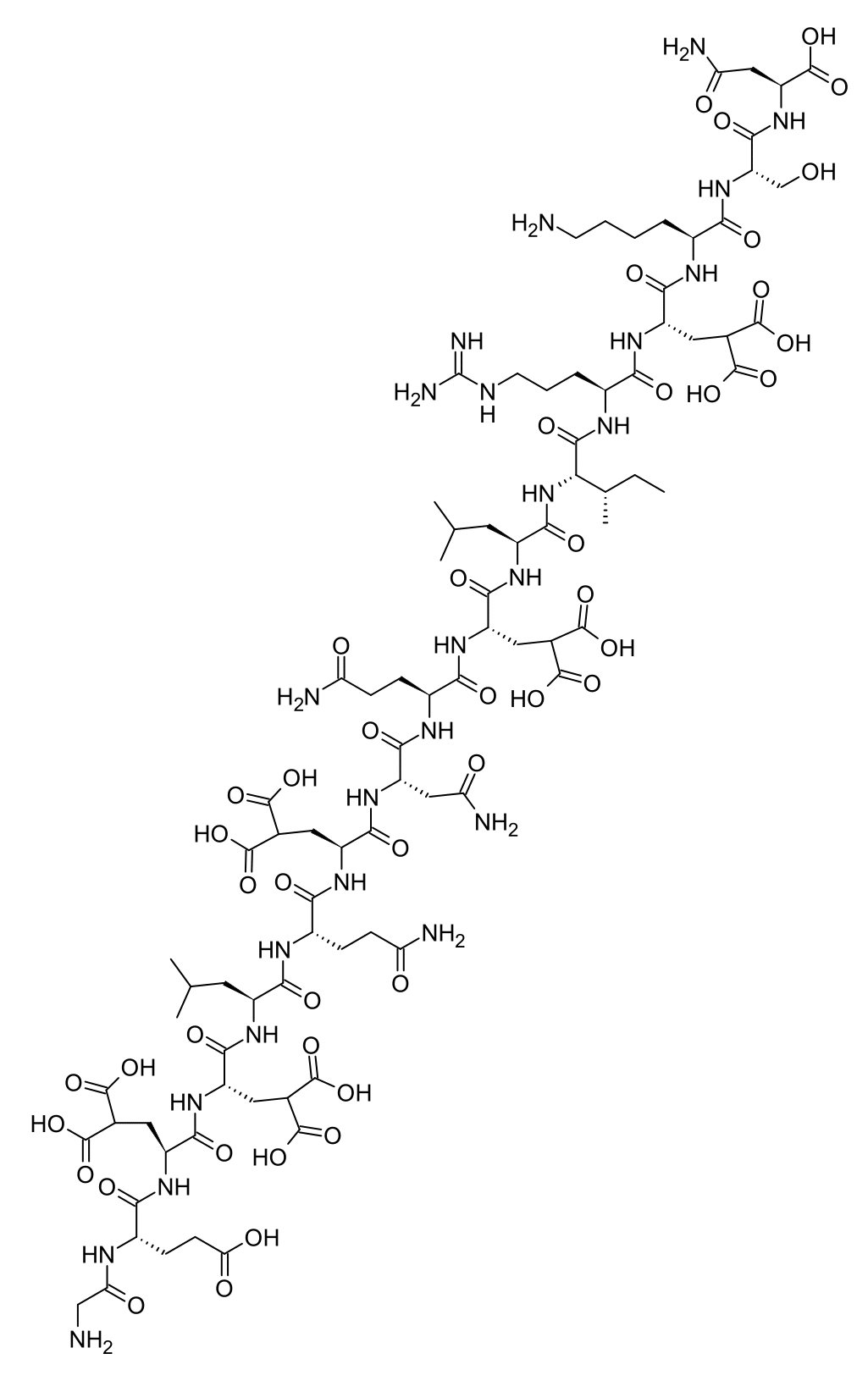

Identifiers
- IUPAC name: 2-[(2S)-2-[[(2S)-2-[[(2S,3S)-2-[[(2S)-2-[[(2S)-2-[[(2S)-5-amino-2-[[(2S)-4-amino-2-[[(2S)-2-[[(2S)-5-amino-2-[[(2S)-2-[[(2S)-2-[[(2S)-2-[[(2S)-2-[(2-aminoacetyl)amino]-4-carboxybutanoyl]amino]-4,4-dicarboxybutanoyl]amino]-4,4-dicarboxybutanoyl]amino]-4-methylpentanoyl]amino]-5-oxopentanoyl]amino]-4,4-dicarboxybutanoyl]amino]-4-oxobutanoyl]amino]-5-oxopentanoyl]amino]-4,4-dicarboxybutanoyl]amino]-4-methylpentanoyl]amino]-3-methylpentanoyl]amino]-5-carbamimidamidopentanoyl]amino]-3-[[(2S)-6-amino-1-[[(2S)-1-[[(1S)-3-amino-1-carboxy-3-oxopropyl]amino]-3-hydroxy-1-oxopropan-2-yl]amino]-1-oxohexan-2-yl]amino]-3-oxopropyl]propanedioic acid
- CAS Number: 133628-78-1
- PubChem CID: 16209752
- ChemSpider: 17337884

Chemical and physical data
- Formula: C_{88}H_{137}N_{25}O_{45}
- Molar mass: 2265.194 g·mol^{−1}
- 3D model (JSmol): Interactive image
- SMILES: CC[C@H](C)[C@@H](C(=O)N[C@@H](CCCNC(=N)N)C(=O)N[C@@H](CC(C(=O)O)C(=O)O)C(=O)N[C@@H](CCCCN)C(=O)N[C@@H](CO)C(=O)N[C@@H](CC(=O)N)C(=O)O)NC(=O)[C@H](CC(C)C)NC(=O)[C@H](CC(C(=O)O)C(=O)O)NC(=O)[C@H](CCC(=O)N)NC(=O)[C@H](CC(=O)N)NC(=O)[C@H](CC(C(=O)O)C(=O)O)NC(=O)[C@H](CCC(=O)N)NC(=O)[C@H](CC(C)C)NC(=O)[C@H](CC(C(=O)O)C(=O)O)NC(=O)[C@H](CC(C(=O)O)C(=O)O)NC(=O)[C@H](CCC(=O)O)NC(=O)CN
- InChI: InChI=1S/C88H137N25O45/c1-7-34(6)61(76(136)102-41(12-10-20-97-88(95)96)62(122)105-47(23-35(77(137)138)78(139)140)68(128)99-40(11-8-9-19-89)63(123)112-54(31-114)75(135)111-53(87(157)158)29-58(94)118)113-74(134)46(22-33(4)5)104-69(129)48(24-36(79(141)142)80(143)144)107-66(126)44(14-17-56(92)116)101-73(133)52(28-57(93)117)110-72(132)50(26-38(83(149)150)84(151)152)108-65(125)43(13-16-55(91)115)100-67(127)45(21-32(2)3)103-70(130)51(27-39(85(153)154)86(155)156)109-71(131)49(25-37(81(145)146)82(147)148)106-64(124)42(15-18-60(120)121)98-59(119)30-90/h32-54,61,114H,7-31,89-90H2,1-6H3,(H2,91,115)(H2,92,116)(H2,93,117)(H2,94,118)(H,98,119)(H,99,128)(H,100,127)(H,101,133)(H,102,136)(H,103,130)(H,104,129)(H,105,122)(H,106,124)(H,107,126)(H,108,125)(H,109,131)(H,110,132)(H,111,135)(H,112,123)(H,113,134)(H,120,121)(H,137,138)(H,139,140)(H,141,142)(H,143,144)(H,145,146)(H,147,148)(H,149,150)(H,151,152)(H,153,154)(H,155,156)(H,157,158)(H4,95,96,97)/t34-,40-,41-,42-,43-,44-,45-,46-,47-,48-,49-,50-,51-,52-,53-,54-,61-/m0/s1; Key:MKBJAZBKZZICDG-QGXIKSNHSA-N

Conantokin G is a naturally occurring 17-amino acid peptide isolated from the venom of the deadly marine cone snail Conus geographus. It has the amino acid sequence GEXXLQXNQXLIRXKSN, where X = gamma-Carboxyglutamic acid, a post-translationally modified derivative of glutamic acid with two COOH groups. It has sedative and analgesic effects in mice, acting as an NMDA receptor antagonist.

== See also ==
- Conotoxin
- DALDA
- KGOP01
- RVD-Hpα
