= Gonadotropin release inhibitor =

A gonadotropin release inhibitor is a substance that reduces the secretion of gonadotropins by the anterior pituitary gland. In particular, this means that it reduces the amount of luteinizing hormone (LH) and/or follicle stimulating hormone (FSH) released.

Gonadotropins are hormones that signal to the gonads and play a crucial role in the process of gonadal development and function in vertebrates. In birds and mammals, luteinizing hormone (LH) regulates sex steroid production as well as ovulation, whereas follicle stimulating hormone (FSH) promotes spermatogenesis and ovarian follicle maturation. Their release is primarily induced by gonadotropin-releasing hormone (GnRH) (a hypothalamic decapeptide isolated from the mammalian brain in the early 1970s), however several other GnRHs have also been identified in the brains of other vertebrates. Some neurochemicals and peripheral hormones (e.g.gamma-aminobutyric acid (GABA), opiates, gonadal sex steroids, inhibin) can modulate gonadotropin release, but a more specific hypothalamic inhibitory hormone was only identified more recently. In birds, a peptide Gonadotropin-inhibitory hormone was found to suppress gonadotropin release, and later homologous neuropeptides were discovered in mammals, coded by the gene NPVF.

== See also ==
- Neuropeptide VF precursor
- Gonadotropin-inhibitory hormone
