= Neuropeptide FF =

Protein-coding gene in the species Homo sapiens

NPFF

Identifiers
- Aliases: NPFF, FMRFAL, neuropeptide FF-amide peptide precursor
- External IDs: OMIM: 604643; MGI: 1891708; GeneCards: NPFF

Gene location (Human)
Chr.	Chromosome 12 (human)
Band	12q13.13	Start	53,506,688 bp
Band	12q13.13	End	53,507,484 bp

Gene location (Mouse)
Chr.	Chromosome 15 (mouse)
Band	15|15 F3	Start	102,432,274 bp
Band	15|15 F3	End	102,433,377 bp
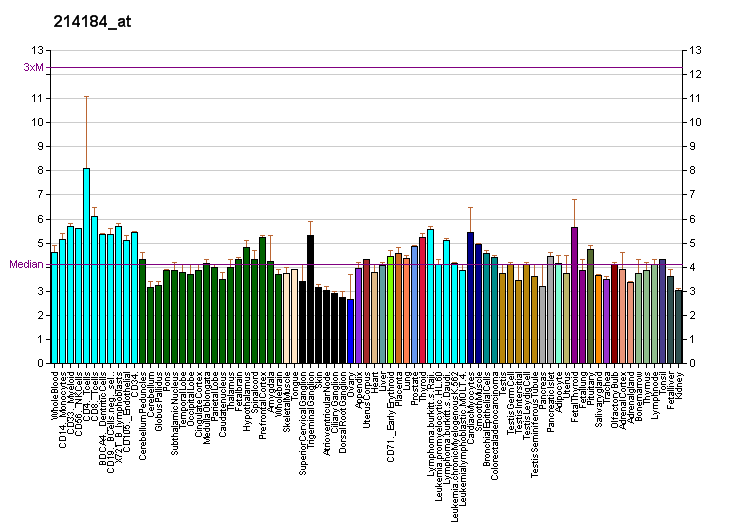

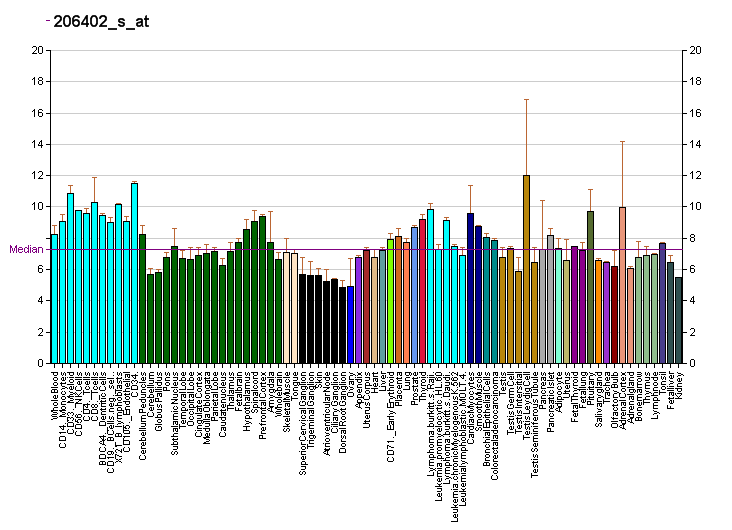
RNA expression pattern
Bgee	Human / Mouse (ortholog); Top expressed in: testicle; gonad; epithelium of colon; granulocyte; ganglionic eminence; apex of heart; olfactory zone of nasal mucosa; C1 segment; stromal cell of endometrium; mucosa of transverse colon / Top expressed in: bone marrow; pancreas; islet of Langerhans; adrenal gland; urinary bladder; skeletal muscle tissue; morula; zone of skin; white adipose tissue; spleen; More reference expression data
BioGPS	More reference expression data
Gene ontology
Molecular function	signaling receptor binding; G protein-coupled receptor binding; neuropeptide hormone activity
Cellular component	vesicle; extracellular region; postsynapse; extracellular space; dendrite; perikaryon; axon terminus
Biological process	negative regulation of insulin secretion; regulation of sensory perception of pain; maternal process involved in female pregnancy; positive regulation of cytosolic calcium ion concentration; acute inflammatory response to antigenic stimulus; negative regulation of appetite; vasopressin secretion; regulation of membrane depolarization; negative regulation of heart rate; response to morphine; positive regulation of blood pressure; spinal cord development; neuropeptide signaling pathway; somatostatin secretion; chemical synaptic transmission; excitatory postsynaptic potential; regulation of signaling receptor activity; G protein-coupled receptor signaling pathway
Sources:Amigo / QuickGO
Orthologs
Databases	NCBI: entry; OMA: entry
Species	Human	Mouse
Entrez	8620	54615
Ensembl	ENSG00000139574	ENSMUSG00000023052
UniProt	O15130	Q9WVA8
RefSeq (mRNA)	NM_003717; NM_001320296	NM_018787
RefSeq (protein)	NP_001307225; NP_003708	NP_061257
Location (UCSC)	Chr 12: 53.51 – 53.51 Mb	Chr 15: 102.43 – 102.43 Mb
PubMed search
- Wikidata
View/Edit Human	View/Edit Mouse

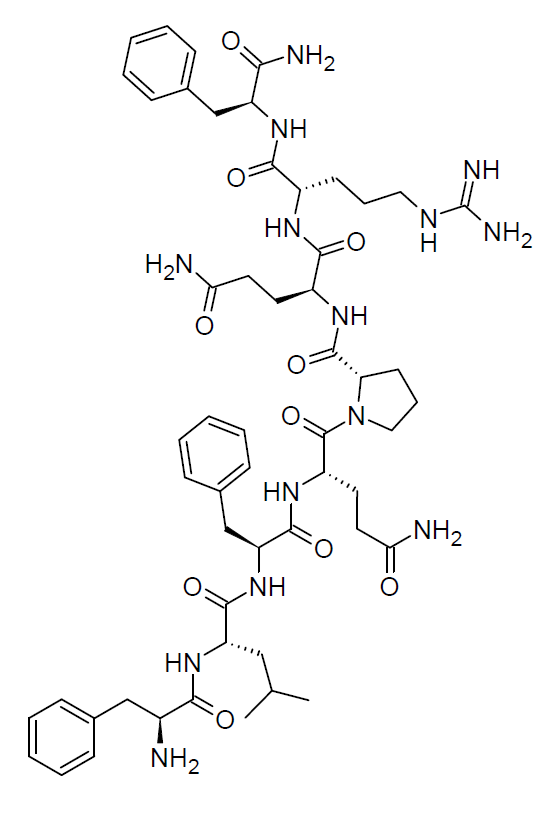
Chemical structure of neuropeptide FF

Neuropeptide FF (NPFF, FLFQPQRFa) is a mammalian amidated neuropeptide originally isolated from bovine brain and characterized as a pain-modulating peptide, with anti-opioid activity on morphine-induced analgesia.

In humans, neuropeptide FF peptides are encoded by the NPFF gene. Two genes encoding two different receptors (NPFF1 and NPFF2) and two precursors [NPFFA (this gene) and NPFFB (NPVF)] have been cloned in several mammalian species.

== Processing ==
Processing of the NPFFA precursor at basic proteolytic sites generates a NPFF-containing peptide with three additional N-terminal amino acids different between species, and a NPSF (SLAAPQRFa)-containing peptide, the length of which depends on the species. NPFFB, identified as a precursor for RFamide-related peptides (RFRPs, also called GnIH for gonadotropin inhibitory hormone), contains a LPLRFa-containing peptide and a peptide sharing with NPFF the same C-terminal PQRFamide motif, such as NPVF (VPNLPQRFa) in human.

== Function ==
Neuropeptide FF (NPFF) and several other RFamide related peptides issued from two precursors, interact with varying affinity with two subtypes of G protein-coupled receptors, namely NPFF1 and NPFF2 subtypes and are involved in several physiological functions such as cardiovascular regulation, hormonal control, macrophage activation, body temperature homeostasis and pain modulation.

NPFF and opioid systems have been shown to interact at several levels, from animal behavior to receptor molecules. Nociception is the physiological function in which this interaction has been the most extensively studied but reward, locomotion, feeding and intestinal motility are also affected. Endogenous opioids are necessary for the analgesic properties of spinally injected NPFF while endogenous NPFF peptides are involved in the process of analgesic tolerance/hyperalgesia induced by chronic opioid treatment.

As well as affecting pain perception, NPFF also modulates related processes such as inflammation and macrophage activation, and neurogenesis during recovery from brain injury, as well as being linked to mood disorders such as depression and anxiety. Peripheral NPFF receptors are also involved in the regulation of blood pressure.

NPFF also controls the number and metabolic effects of adipose tissue macrophages, and NPFF is necessary for adipose tissue health, but over-activation of NPFFR2 receptors has been linked to obesity and metabolic syndrome.

== See also ==
- Neuropeptide VF precursor
