= C32H49N9O5 =

The molecular formula C_{32}H_{49}N_{9}O_{5} (molar mass: 639.802 g/mol) may refer to:

- Elamipretide
- (Dmt1)DALDA
