= AL-VI10 =

Chemical and physical data
- Formula: C_{52}H_{86}N_{10}O_{13}
- Molar mass: 1059.317 g·mol^{−1}
- 3D model (JSmol): Interactive image
- SMILES: CC(C)[C@H](NC(=O)[C@@H](NC(=O)[C@@H](NC(=O)[C@@H](NC(=O)[C@@H](NC(=O)[C@@H]1CCCN1C(=O)[C@@H](NC(=O)[C@@H](N)C(C)C)[C@@H](C)CC)Cc1ccccc1)C(C)C)C(C)C)CO)C(=O)N[C@H](C(=O)N[C@H](C(O)=O)[C@H](O)C)C(C)C
- InChI: InChI=InChI=1S/C52H86N10O13/c1-14-30(12)41(60-46(68)36(53)25(2)3)51(73)62-22-18-21-35(62)45(67)54-33(23-32-19-16-15-17-20-32)43(65)56-38(27(6)7)48(70)58-37(26(4)5)47(69)55-34(24-63)44(66)57-39(28(8)9)49(71)59-40(29(10)11)50(72)61-42(31(13)64)52(74)75/h15-17,19-20,25-31,33-42,63-64H,14,18,21-24,53H2,1-13H3,(H,54,67)(H,55,69)(H,56,65)(H,57,66)(H,58,70)(H,59,71)(H,60,68)(H,61,72)(H,74,75)/t30-,31+,33-,34-,35-,36-,37-,38-,39-,40-,41-,42-/m0/s1; Key:NGOPCTCZLHOHOZ-PIUJGFPJSA-N

AL-VI10 is a polypeptide 10 amino acids in length, with the sequence VIPFVVSVVT or Val–Ile–Pro–Phe–Val–Val–Ser–Val–Val–Thr. It is derived from the skin secretions of the Chinese frog Amolops loloensis, and acts as an activator of SIRT1 and NRF2.

== See also ==
- CI5 (peptide)
- Dermorphin
