= Hemopressin =

Names
- IUPAC name (2S)-2-[[(2S)-2-[[(2S)-2-[[(2S)-2-[[(2S)-6-amino-2-[[(2S)-2-[[(2S)-4-amino-2-[[(2S)-3-methyl-2-[[(2S)-pyrrolidine-2-carbonyl]amino]butanoyl]amino]-4-oxo-butanoyl]amino]-3-phenyl-propanoyl]amino]hexanoyl]amino]-3-phenyl-propanoyl]amino]-4-methyl-pentanoyl]amino]-3-hydroxy-propanoyl]amino]-3-(1H-imidazol-5-yl)propanoic acid

Identifiers
CAS Number	568588-77-2
3D model (JSmol)	Interactive image
ChEMBL	ChEMBL510801
ChemSpider	23327737
PubChem CID	44560117
CompTox Dashboard (EPA)	DTXSID301029393
- InChI: InChI=1S/C53H77N13O12/c1-30(2)22-37(47(71)65-42(28-67)51(75)64-41(53(77)78)25-34-27-56-29-58-34)60-49(73)39(24-33-16-9-6-10-17-33)61-46(70)36(18-11-12-20-54)59-48(72)38(23-32-14-7-5-8-15-32)62-50(74)40(26-43(55)68)63-52(76)44(31(3)4)66-45(69)35-19-13-21-57-35/h5-10,14-17,27,29-31,35-42,44,57,67H,11-13,18-26,28,54H2,1-4H3,(H2,55,68)(H,56,58)(H,59,72)(H,60,73)(H,61,70)(H,62,74)(H,63,76)(H,64,75)(H,65,71)(H,66,69)(H,77,78)/t35-,36-,37-,38-,39-,40-,41-,42-,44-/m0/s1 Key: DUTLYPZZJJBEAJ-QISMNGAHSA-N; InChI=1/C53H77N13O12/c1-30(2)22-37(47(71)65-42(28-67)51(75)64-41(53(77)78)25-34-27-56-29-58-34)60-49(73)39(24-33-16-9-6-10-17-33)61-46(70)36(18-11-12-20-54)59-48(72)38(23-32-14-7-5-8-15-32)62-50(74)40(26-43(55)68)63-52(76)44(31(3)4)66-45(69)35-19-13-21-57-35/h5-10,14-17,27,29-31,35-42,44,57,67H,11-13,18-26,28,54H2,1-4H3,(H2,55,68)(H,56,58)(H,59,72)(H,60,73)(H,61,70)(H,62,74)(H,63,76)(H,64,75)(H,65,71)(H,66,69)(H,77,78)/t35-,36-,37-,38-,39-,40-,41-,42-,44-/m0/s1 Key: DUTLYPZZJJBEAJ-QISMNGAHBC
- SMILES: CC(C)C[C@@H](C(=O)N[C@@H](CO)C(=O)N[C@@H](Cc1cnc[nH]1)C(=O)O)NC(=O)[C@H](Cc2ccccc2)NC(=O)[C@H](CCCCN)NC(=O)[C@H](Cc3ccccc3)NC(=O)[C@H](CC(=O)N)NC(=O)[C@H](C(C)C)NC(=O)[C@@H]4CCCN4

Properties
Chemical formula	C_{53}H_{77}N_{13}O_{12}
Molar mass	1088.25838
- Except where otherwise noted, data are given for materials in their standard state (at 25 °C [77 °F], 100 kPa). verify (what is ?) Infobox references

Hemopressin (Hp) is an alpha hemoglobin fragment with the sequence PVNFKFLSH, originally identified in extracts of rat brain using an enzyme capture technique. It binds cannabinoid receptors, acting as an inverse agonist at CB_{1} receptors. Longer forms of hemopressin containing 2-3 additional amino acids on the N-terminus have been identified in extracts of mouse brain. These longer hemopressin peptides, named RVD-Hpα and VD-Hpα, bind to CB1 receptors and were originally reported to be agonists. In addition to the Hp peptides from alpha hemoglobin, a related peptide from beta hemoglobin has been found in mouse brain extracts; this peptide, named VD-Hpβ, is also an agonist at CB1 cannabinoid receptors. Hemopressin is not an endogenous peptide but rather an extraction artefact. The only endogenous peptide found endogenously at physiological conditions is RVD-hemopressin (pepcan-12), which has more recently been shown to be a negative allosteric modulator of CB1 receptors and positive allosteric modulator of CB2 receptors. RVD-hemopressin (pepcan-12) is generated from a pro-peptide called pepcan-23 and these peptides are exclusively found in noradrenergic neurons in the brain and in the adrenal medulla.

The original Hp peptide reduces sensitivity to painful stimuli in an experimental model of hyperalgesia. Hp also reduces food intake in mice. However, it remains to be shown if Hp is an endogenous brain peptide. The original purification used boiling acid to extract the peptide from rat brain, and hot acid can specifically cleave D-P bonds. The N-terminally-extended forms RVD-Hpα and VD-Hpα may represent the true endogenous forms.

== Role in diet ==
Scientists at the University of Manchester have discovered that hemopressin could be used as an appetite suppressant without having the side effects of many other drugs that are used for this purpose. In laboratory tests hemopressin was administrated to mice and rats, which significantly reduced food intake. Hemopressin works by affecting the reward centres of the brain which make us feel happy when we eat too much. A further research should be carried out in order to confirm these effects and the safety on people.

== See also ==
- RVD-Hpα
