= H-20 (peptide) =

Identifiers
- IUPAC name: (2S)-6-amino-2-[[(2S)-2-[[(2S)-2-[[(2S)-2-[[2-[[2-[[(2S)-2-[[(2S)-2-[[(2S,3S)-2-amino-3-methylpentanoyl]amino]-3-hydroxypropanoyl]amino]-3-(4-hydroxyphenyl)propanoyl]amino]acetyl]amino]acetyl]amino]propanoyl]amino]-3-carboxypropanoyl]amino]-3-(4-hydroxyphenyl)propanoyl]amino]hexanoic acid
- CAS Number: 3020015-02-2
- PubChem CID: 175678593
- ChemSpider: 133325297

Chemical and physical data
- Formula: C_{44}H_{64}N_{10}O_{15}
- Molar mass: 973.051 g·mol^{−1}
- 3D model (JSmol): Interactive image
- SMILES: CC[C@H](C)[C@@H](C(=O)N[C@@H](CO)C(=O)N[C@@H](CC1=CC=C(C=C1)O)C(=O)NCC(=O)NCC(=O)N[C@@H](C)C(=O)N[C@@H](CC(=O)O)C(=O)N[C@@H](CC2=CC=C(C=C2)O)C(=O)N[C@@H](CCCCN)C(=O)O)N
- InChI: InChI=1S/C44H64N10O15/c1-4-23(2)37(46)43(67)54-33(22-55)42(66)52-30(17-25-8-12-27(56)13-9-25)39(63)48-20-34(58)47-21-35(59)49-24(3)38(62)51-32(19-36(60)61)41(65)53-31(18-26-10-14-28(57)15-11-26)40(64)50-29(44(68)69)7-5-6-16-45/h8-15,23-24,29-33,37,55-57H,4-7,16-22,45-46H2,1-3H3,(H,47,58)(H,48,63)(H,49,59)(H,50,64)(H,51,62)(H,52,66)(H,53,65)(H,54,67)(H,60,61)(H,68,69)/t23-,24-,29-,30-,31-,32-,33-,37-/m0/s1; Key:UVFJQIBNIVDIKQ-IJICPDOISA-N

H-20 is a polypeptide 9 amino acids in length, with the sequence ISYGGADYK or Ile-Ser-Tyr-Gly-Gly-Ala-Asp-Tyr-Lys. It acts as a selective agonist for Programmed cell death protein 1 (PD-1), a protein which is expressed primarily on T cells and B cells in the immune system, but also on some other cell types. While most research into this target has focused on PD-1 inhibitors as potential treatments for some forms of cancer, activation of PD-1 signaling in neurons regulates neuronal excitability and reduces transmission of pain signals, producing analgesic effects without the side effects associated with traditional analgesic drugs. While H-20 itself may be unlikely to be developed for medical use, it represents a proof of concept of PD-1 as a potential target for novel analgesic drugs.

== See also ==
- CI5 (peptide)
- (Dmt1)DALDA
- KGOP01
