= RFamide peptide family =

Family of neuropeptides

The RFamide peptide family, or the RFamide-related peptides (RFRPs), are a family of neuropeptides. They are characterized by the possession of an Arg-Phe-NH_{2} motif at their C-terminal extremities.

Members of the family include:

- Neuropeptide FF group
  - Neuropeptide AF
  - Neuropeptide FF
  - Neuropeptide SF (RFRP-1)
  - Neuropeptide VF (RFRP-3) (GnIH - avian species)
- Prolactin-releasing peptide (PrRP)
- Pyroglutamylated RFamide peptide (QRFP)
- Kisspeptin (disputed)

== See also ==
- Neuropeptide VF precursor
- FMRFamide
