= IL-6 =

IL6, Il-6, or IL-6 may refer to:

- Illinois's 6th congressional district
- Illinois Route 6
- Ilyushin Il-6, a Soviet long-range bomber
- Interleukin 6, a pro-inflammatory cytokine
