= RF9 (drug) =

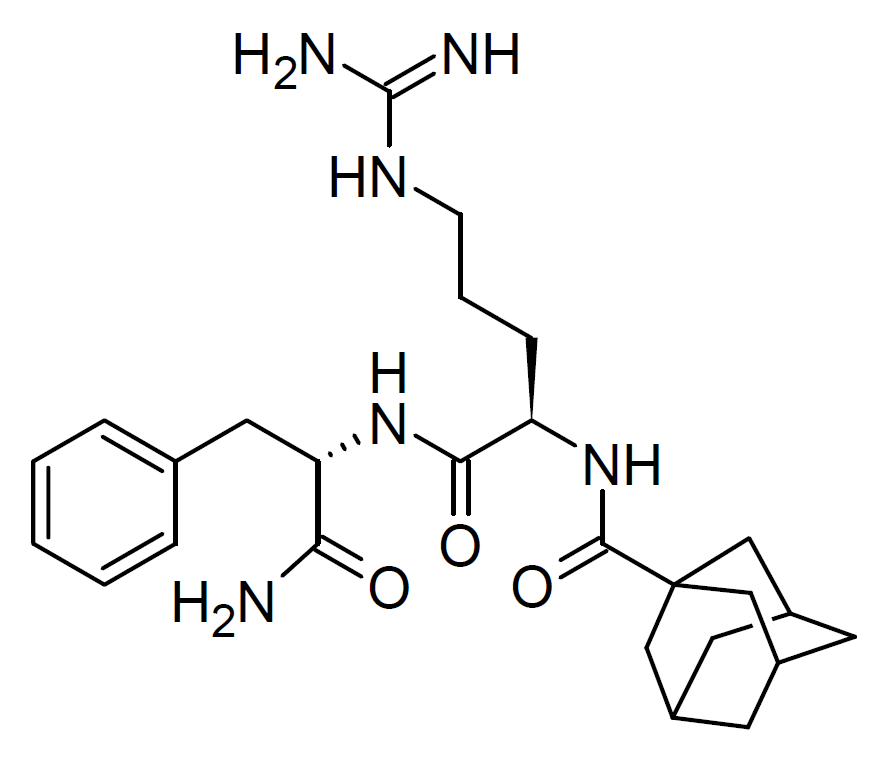

Identifiers
- IUPAC name: (1S,3S,5S,7S)-N-((S)-1-(((S)-1-Amino-1-oxo-3-phenylpropan-2-yl)amino)-5-guanidino-1-oxopentan-2-yl)adamantane-2-carboxamide
- CAS Number: 876310-60-0
- PubChem CID: 53320361
- ChemSpider: 9866263
- ChEBI: CHEBI:140980
- ChEMBL: ChEMBL1672380
- CompTox Dashboard (EPA): DTXSID001151466

Chemical and physical data
- Formula: C_{26}H_{38}N_{6}O_{3}
- Molar mass: 482.629 g·mol^{−1}
- 3D model (JSmol): Interactive image
- SMILES: O=C(N[C@H]([C@](N[C@H](C(N)=O)CC4=CC=CC=C4)=O)CCCNC(N)=N)C1(CC(C3)C2)CC3CC2C1
- InChI: InChI=1S/C26H38N6O3/c27-23(33)21(14-15-5-2-1-3-6-15)32-24(34)20(7-4-8-30-26(28)29)31-25(35)22-18-10-16-9-17(12-18)13-19(22)11-16/h1-3,5-6,16-22H,4,7-14H2,(H2,27,33)(H,31,35)(H,32,34)(H4,28,29,30)/t16?,17?,18?,19?,20-,21-,22?/m0/s1; Key:ZLSDDXOZWMSRNZ-BFLAJNRSSA-N

RF9 is a drug used in scientific research which acts as a potent and selective antagonist for the neuropeptide FF receptors NPFF1 and NPFF2, binding to both NPFF subtypes but with improved selectivity over related targets such as neuropeptide Y receptors compared to older drugs such as BIBP-3226. In animal studies, RF9 increased the analgesic effects of mu-opioid agonists while decreasing some side effects such as hyperalgesia.
