= HuaChanSu =

HuaChanSu (bufo bufo gargarizans) is a traditional Chinese medicine extracted from the skin of toads from the genus Bufo that is believed by some to slow the spread of cancerous cells. The parotoid gland of toads of the Bufo genus secrete a venom, which is dried and dissolved in water. This solution, HuaChanSu, is injected into a cancerous area and targets specific cancer cells. HuaChanSu is undergoing further trials, and its effect is not completely understood.

== Background ==
HuaChanSu had been used in China as a therapy for cancer for over 1000 years and over time spread to other Asian countries. In 1991, HuaChanSu was accepted by China as an official cancer treatment. Even then, the treatment's effectiveness and toxicity levels were still at question due to the lack of consistent scientific evidence.

== Bufo toad ==
Bufo is a group of over 150 species of toads. Nearly all of these species contain a venom in their skin called bufotoxin which is a naturally a mild hallucinogen. They also contain the poison bufotenin which is another toxin used in HuaChanSu. Bufo toads can live under very adverse conditions resulting in its inhabitance in nearly every continent; its ability to survive makes it a desired source for cancer cure studies.

== Specific molecular process ==
The molecules in HuaChanSu include the cardiac glycosides bufalin, cinobufagin, cinobufotalin and resibufogenin. These molecules are effective due to their lipid-soluble characteristic, which helps them remain in the body longer; they slow the growth of cancer cells and induce cell cycle arrest. More specifically, these molecules suppress the protein Bcl-2, which is a cancer-prone lymphoma protein, and induce cell death upon BRO (melanoma) cells.

== Trials ==
Since the 1970s, clinical trials for HuaChanSu had been held in China. The clinical trials showed between 10% and 16% decrease in lung cancer masses. At first, the United States was reluctant to invest in the study of HuaChanSu, but in 2005, trials were administered by Americans who applied doses that were eight times larger than those from the Chinese trials. These trials resulted with 40% of lung and liver cancer patients having tumors stabilized. Although no significant change was made in tumor sizes, the quality of life of the patients with stabilized tumors improved, evaluated by M.D. Anderson Symptom Inventory (MDASI).

However, "Efficacy and Safety of Huachansu as an Adjuvant Therapy for Non-Small Cell Lung Cancer: An Overview of Systematic Reviews and Meta-Analyses" in 2024 has concluded that research that were fully reported according the PRISMA checklist was only 50%, and majority of publications had a risk of bias according to the ROBIS.

== Toxicity and side effects ==
The toxicity levels of HuaChanSu were also recorded and studied during the various trials. The toad venom was found to have grade 1 and 2 toxicity levels in majority of the injected areas. No toxicity greater than grade 2 was observed and the effects subsided within a month. These side effects included thrombocytopenia, diarrhea, mouth ulcers, and myalgia.

== See also ==
- CI5 (peptide)
