= (Dmt1)DALDA =

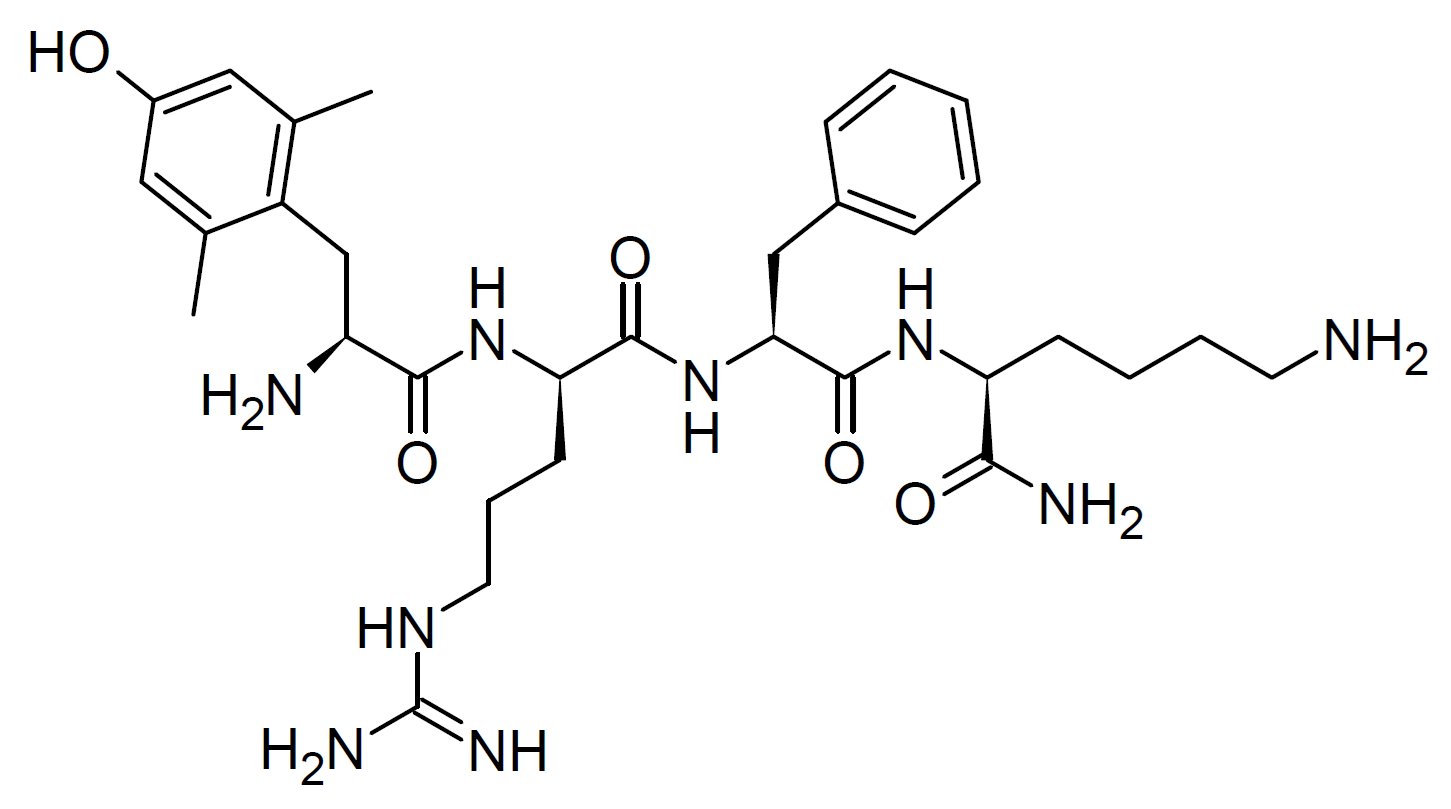

Identifiers
- IUPAC name: (2S)-6-amino-2-[[(2S)-2-[[(2R)-2-[[(2S)-2-amino-3-(4-hydroxy-2,6-dimethylphenyl)propanoyl]amino]-5-(diaminomethylideneamino)pentanoyl]amino]-3-phenylpropanoyl]amino]hexanamide
- CAS Number: 255861-98-4
- PubChem CID: 9809562
- ChemSpider: 7985318
- ChEMBL: ChEMBL2181202
- CompTox Dashboard (EPA): DTXSID20430981

Chemical and physical data
- Formula: C_{32}H_{49}N_{9}O_{5}
- Molar mass: 639.802 g·mol^{−1}
- 3D model (JSmol): Interactive image
- SMILES: CC1=CC(=CC(=C1C[C@@H](C(=O)N[C@H](CCCN=C(N)N)C(=O)N[C@@H](CC2=CC=CC=C2)C(=O)N[C@@H](CCCCN)C(=O)N)N)C)O
- InChI: InChI=1S/C32H49N9O5/c1-19-15-22(42)16-20(2)23(19)18-24(34)29(44)40-26(12-8-14-38-32(36)37)30(45)41-27(17-21-9-4-3-5-10-21)31(46)39-25(28(35)43)11-6-7-13-33/h3-5,9-10,15-16,24-27,42H,6-8,11-14,17-18,33-34H2,1-2H3,(H2,35,43)(H,39,46)(H,40,44)(H,41,45)(H4,36,37,38)/t24-,25-,26+,27-/m0/s1; Key:FIAKHZXVLBNZLW-NFGXINMFSA-N

[Dmt1]DALDA (DMT-DALDA, Dmt^{1}-DALDA, H-Dmt-D-Arg-Phe-Lys-NH2) is a synthetic peptide which acts as a potent and selective agonist of the mu opioid receptor.

It is a derivative of DALDA, a synthetic opioid peptide developed as a metabolically stable analogue of the natural product dermorphin, with the N-terminal tyrosine residue replaced by 2′,6′-dimethyltyrosine. [Dmt1]DALDA crosses the blood-brain barrier and produces centrally mediated analgesia after systemic administration in animal studies.

A case report from the Hong Kong Jockey Club documented the identification of [Dmt1]DALDA in a seized, unlabelled vial and its first reported detection in horse urine.

Related opioid peptides have subsequently been developed with varying receptor selectivity, including agonists and antagonists. [Dmt1]DALDA has also been incorporated into a peptide with μ-opioid receptor agonist and δ-opioid receptor antagonist activity.

== See also ==
- CI5 (peptide)
- KGOP01
- H-20 (peptide)
