= Medical massage =

Term

Medical massage is a controversial term in the massage profession. Many use it to describe a specific technique. Others use it to describe a general category of massage and many methods such as deep tissue massage, myofascial release and trigger-point therapy, as well as osteopathic techniques, cranial-sacral techniques and many more can be used to work with various medical conditions. Massage used in the medical field includes decongestive therapy used for lymphedema which can be used in conjunction with the treatment of breast cancer. Light massage is also used in pain management and palliative care. Carotid sinus massage is used to diagnose carotid sinus syncope and is sometimes useful for differentiating supraventricular tachycardia (SVT) from ventricular tachycardia. It, like the valsalva maneuver, is a therapy for SVT. However, it is less effective than management of SVT with medications.

A 2004 systematic review found single applications of massage therapy "reduced state anxiety, blood pressure, and heart rate but not negative mood, immediate assessment of pain, and cortisol level," while "multiple applications reduced delayed assessment of pain," and found improvements in anxiety and depression similar to effects of psychotherapy. A subsequent systematic review published in 2008 found that there is little evidence supporting the use of massage therapy for depression in high quality studies from randomized controlled trials.
