= FMRFamide =

Names
- Other names FMRF amide; H-Phe-Met-Arg-Phe-NH2; L-Phenylalanyl-L-methionyl-L-arginyl-L-phenylalaninamide

Identifiers
CAS Number	64190-70-1
3D model (JSmol)	Interactive image
ChEMBL	ChEMBL262202
ChemSpider	8275617
IUPHAR/BPS	4195
PubChem CID	10100083
UNII	8953X1KZFL
CompTox Dashboard (EPA)	DTXSID00982731
- InChI: InChI=1S/C29H42N8O4S/c1-42-16-14-23(35-26(39)21(30)17-19-9-4-2-5-10-19)28(41)36-22(13-8-15-34-29(32)33)27(40)37-24(25(31)38)18-20-11-6-3-7-12-20/h2-7,9-12,21-24H,8,13-18,30H2,1H3,(H2,31,38)(H,35,39)(H,36,41)(H,37,40)(H4,32,33,34)/t21-,22-,23-,24-/m0/s1 Key: WCSPDMCSKYUFBX-ZJZGAYNASA-N
- SMILES: CSCC[C@@H](C(=O)N[C@@H](CCCN=C(N)N)C(=O)N[C@@H](CC1=CC=CC=C1)C(=O)N)NC(=O)[C@H](CC2=CC=CC=C2)N

Properties
Chemical formula	C_{29}H_{42}N_{8}O_{4}S
Molar mass	598.77 g·mol^{−1}
- Except where otherwise noted, data are given for materials in their standard state (at 25 °C [77 °F], 100 kPa). Infobox references

FMRFamide (H-Phe-Met-Arg-Phe-NH2) is a neuropeptide from a broad family of FMRFamide-related peptides (FaRPs) all sharing an -RFamide sequence at their C-terminus. First identified in Hard clam (Mercenaria mercenaria), it is thought to play an important role in cardiac activity regulation. Several FMRFamide related peptides are known, regulating various cellular functions and possessing pharmacological actions, such as anti-opiate effects. In Mercenaria mercenaria, FMRFamide has been isolated and demonstrated to increase both the force and frequency of the heartbeat through a biochemical pathway that is thought to involve the increase of cytoplasmic cAMP in the ventricular region.

FMRFamide is an important neuropeptide in several phyla such as Insecta, Nematoda, Mollusca, and Annelida. It is the most abundant neuropeptide in endocrine cells of insect alimentary tracts along with allatostatin and tachykinin families, however the neuropeptide's function is not known. Generally, the neuropeptide is encoded by several genes such as flp-1 through flp-22 in C. elegans. The common precursor of the FaRPs is modified to yield many different neuropeptides all having the same FMRFamide sequence. Moreover, these peptides are not functionally redundant.

In invertebrates, the FMRFamide-related peptides are known to affect heart rate, blood pressure, gut motility, feeding behaviour and reproduction. In vertebrates such as mice, they are known to affect opioid receptors resulting in elicitation of naloxone-sensitive antinociception and reduction of morphine-induced antinociception.

Detection of this neuropeptide is important because its expression lays down the foundation of the CNS in the early stages of development in invertebrates. In recent years, neuromodulatory actions of FMRFamide in invertebrates have become more apparent. This is, in part, due to the extensive studies done on the Planorbid and Lymnaeid families of pond snails.

== See also ==
- Neuropeptide VF precursor
