= Gonadotropin-inhibitory hormone =

Gonadotropin-inhibitory hormone (GnIH), also known as Neuropeptide VF (NPVF) or RFRP-3, is a RFamide-related peptide coded by the NPVF gene in mammals.

== Discovery ==
GnIH was discovered in 2000. It is an RFamide peptide that significantly reduced luteinizing hormone release in Coturnix Japonica (Japanese quail). This peptide emerged as the first tropic hormone known to inhibit gonadotropin secretion in the hypothalamic-pituitary-gonadal axis of vertebrates. Subsequent research identified GnIH peptide homologs in variety of mammals, including humans.

== Structure ==
GnIH is a neurohormone classified as an RFamide (RFa) or RFamide-related peptide (RFRP), coded by the NPVF gene in mammals. The complete amino acid sequence varies by species, but all RFa and RFRP peptides contain an arginine-phenylalanine-amine sequence at the C-terminal. This is seen in both Coturnix Japonica GnIH RFa (Ser-Ile-Lys-Pro-Ser-Ala-Tyr-Leu-Pro-Leu-Arg-Phe-NH2), and the human homolog, RFRP-3 (Val-Pro-Asp-Leu-Pro-Glu-Arg-Phe-NH2).

== Production ==
GnIH neurons reside primarily in the dorsomedial nucleus of the hypothalamus (humans and rodents) and the paraventricular nucleus of the hypothalamus (avian species). Some GnIH neuron terminals in both mammalian and avian species project to the median eminence. GnIH and GnRH (gonadotropin releasing hormone) neurons exist in close proximity in the hypothalamus, which may enable the direct inhibition of GnRH neurons by GnIH. GnIH enters the bloodstream via the hypothalamo-hypophyseal portal system, the vascular network supplying both the hypothalamus and the pituitary.

GnIH and GnIH receptor (GnIH-R) mRNA is expressed in the hypothalamus, pituitary, and ovaries. GnIH expression is highest during proestrus and lowest during estrus, suggesting the estrus cycle influences release of the hormone. Furthermore, GnIH neuronal cell counts in multiple vertebrates fluctuate with an organism's parental status. GnIH cell count may also vary with breeding season in some species. For instance, European starlings (Sturnus vulgaris) with greater reproductive success exhibited higher quantities of GnIH-producing cells than did those that were less successful, but this effect did not appear until mid-breeding season.

== Receptor action ==
GnIH binds to the Gαi protein coupled receptor GPR147 to suppress adenylyl cyclase formation of cAMP and inhibit protein kinase cascades affecting gene expression. GnIH inhibits the same signaling pathway that GnRH activates to promote follicle stimulating hormone (FSH) and luteinizing hormone (LH) expression. The compound RF9 is a known GPR147 receptor antagonist.

== Effects and physiological function ==
GnIH-R expression in the pituitary and other brain regions implies GnIH acts directly on the pituitary to downregulate gonadotropin production, impacting reproductive behaviors. This neurohormone also acts on the hypothalamus to inhibit the expression of GnRH, which may further inhibit gonadotropin secretion, and kisspeptin, which may inhibit kisspeptin-mediated stimulation of GnRH neurons prior to the preovulatory hormonal surge. GnIH also spurs the production of cytochrome P450 aromatase, promoting the synthesis of neuroestrogen in the brains of quails and reducing aggressivity in reproductive behaviors.

In male vertebrates, GnIH reduces testis size, lowers testosterone secretion, and increases the incidence of apoptosis in germ cells and Sertoli cells of the seminiferous tubules. These gonadal changes, in addition to GnIH and GnIH-R mRNA expression in the seminiferous tubules, Sertoli cells, and spermatogonia, implicate function in spermatogenesis. In female vertebrates, high doses of GnIH increases ovarian mass and produce follicle irregularities, such as vacuole formation in nuclei and distorted morphology. Ovarian changes in response to GnIH administration, as well as GnIH/GnIH-R mRNA expression in granulosa cells and luteal cells in different stages of the estrus cycle, implicate function in development of follicles and atresia.

== Additional biological roles ==
Stress-induced adrenal hormone increase may upregulate GnIH release, as some GnIH neurons have adrenal glucocorticoid receptors. GnIH may therefore mediate interactions between the HPG and HPA (hypothalamic-pituitary-adrenal) axes and play a role in stress-related infertility. GnIH neurons of the paraventricular nucleus in the hypothalamus also express melatonin receptors. Because melatonin secretion is modulated by environmental light patterns, melatonin influence on GnIH production may enable photoperiodic regulation of reproduction in seasonally breeding birds, rodents, and sheep.

GnIH increases food consumption, implying a role in appetite. This finding is consistent with the location of most GnIH neurons, as the dorsomedial nucleus of the hypothalamus is involved in appetite regulation. GnIH may allow the energy reserves of an organism to modulate reproduction.

Higher levels of thyroid hormone suppress GnIH expression, and lower levels of thyroid hormone are associated with higher GnIH levels. The inactivation of GnIH expression prevents delayed puberty caused by hypothyroidism, demonstrating that GnIH mediates interactions between the HPG and HPT (hypothalamic-pituitary-thyroid) axes. Furthermore, thyroid hormone may function in a pathway for photoperiodic regulation of reproduction involving GnIH and energy status. Melatonin modulates thyroid-stimulating hormone (TSH) production in the anterior pituitary, and TSH promotes thyroid hormone production. Thyroid hormone production influences metabolism and GnIH production, both of which impact reproduction.
