= DALDA =

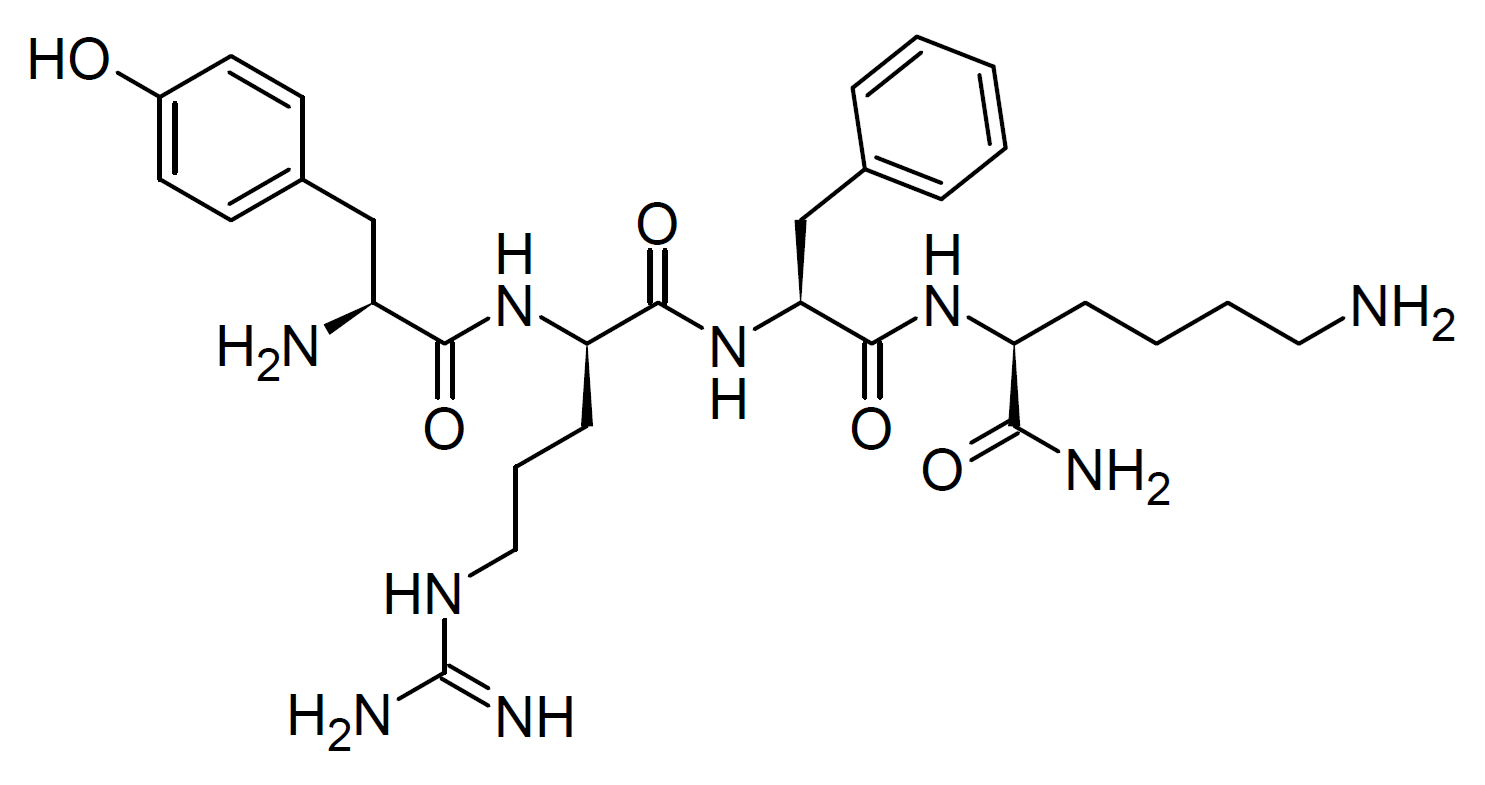

Clinical data
- Other names: Dermorphin [D-Arg2, Lys4] (1-4) Amide

Identifiers
- IUPAC name: (2S)-6-amino-2-[[(2S)-2-[[(2R)-2-[[(2S)-2-amino-3-(4-hydroxyphenyl)propanoyl]amino]-5-(diaminomethylideneamino)pentanoyl]amino]-3-phenylpropanoyl]amino]hexanamide
- CAS Number: 118476-85-0
- PubChem CID: 122222
- ChemSpider: 109004
- UNII: FS8087FL3X
- ChEMBL: ChEMBL60444

Chemical and physical data
- Formula: C_{30}H_{45}N_{9}O_{5}
- Molar mass: 611.748 g·mol^{−1}
- 3D model (JSmol): Interactive image
- SMILES: C1=CC=C(C=C1)C[C@@H](C(=O)N[C@@H](CCCCN)C(=O)N)NC(=O)[C@@H](CCCN=C(N)N)NC(=O)[C@H](CC2=CC=C(C=C2)O)N
- InChI: InChI=1S/C30H45N9O5/c31-15-5-4-9-23(26(33)41)37-29(44)25(18-19-7-2-1-3-8-19)39-28(43)24(10-6-16-36-30(34)35)38-27(42)22(32)17-20-11-13-21(40)14-12-20/h1-3,7-8,11-14,22-25,40H,4-6,9-10,15-18,31-32H2,(H2,33,41)(H,37,44)(H,38,42)(H,39,43)(H4,34,35,36)/t22-,23-,24+,25-/m0/s1; Key:UEVAHGMTRWGMTB-JBXUNAHCSA-N

DALDA (H-Tyr-D-Arg-Phe-Lys-NH2) is a synthetic peptide which acts as a potent and highly selective agonist of the mu opioid receptor. It is a metabolically stable analogue of dermorphin, a naturally occurring opioid peptide secreted by some species of South American frogs. DALDA is unable to cross the blood-brain barrier, making it highly peripherally selective, but it has been researched for the treatment of colitis and neuropathic pain, where peripheral opioid agonism is able to produce analgesic effects in the absence of central opioid receptor activation. Some derivatives of DALDA such as (Dmt1)DALDA (where the tyrosine residue has been replaced with 2,6-dimethyltyrosine) or more complexly modified derivatives such as KGOP01, do however cross the blood-brain barrier and produce typical opioid effects.

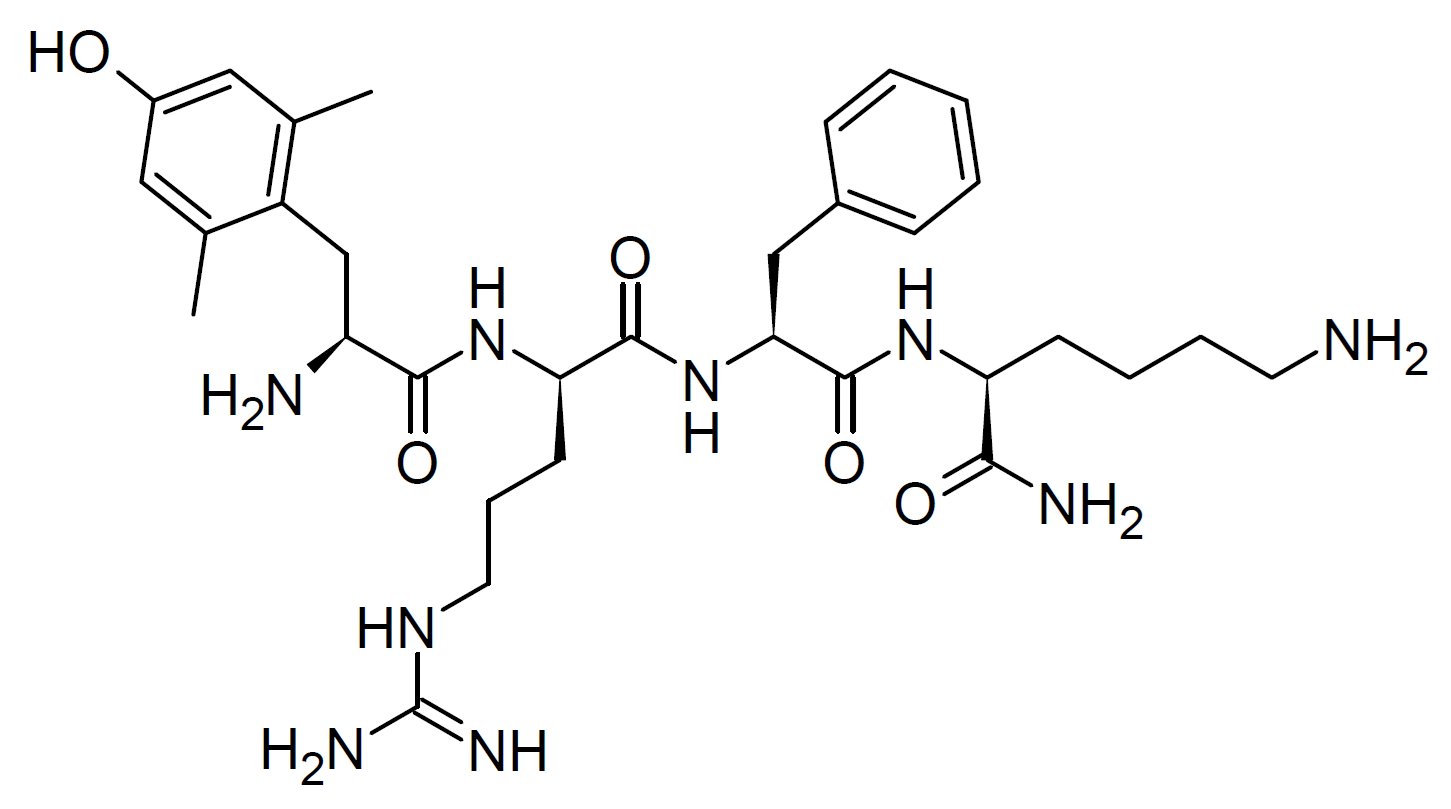
[Dmt1]DALDA, CAS# 255861-98-4 PMID 9809562
