= RVD-Hpα =

Endogenous neuropeptide found in mammalian brain

RVD-Hpα fragment of hemoglobin (pepcan-12), alpha 1
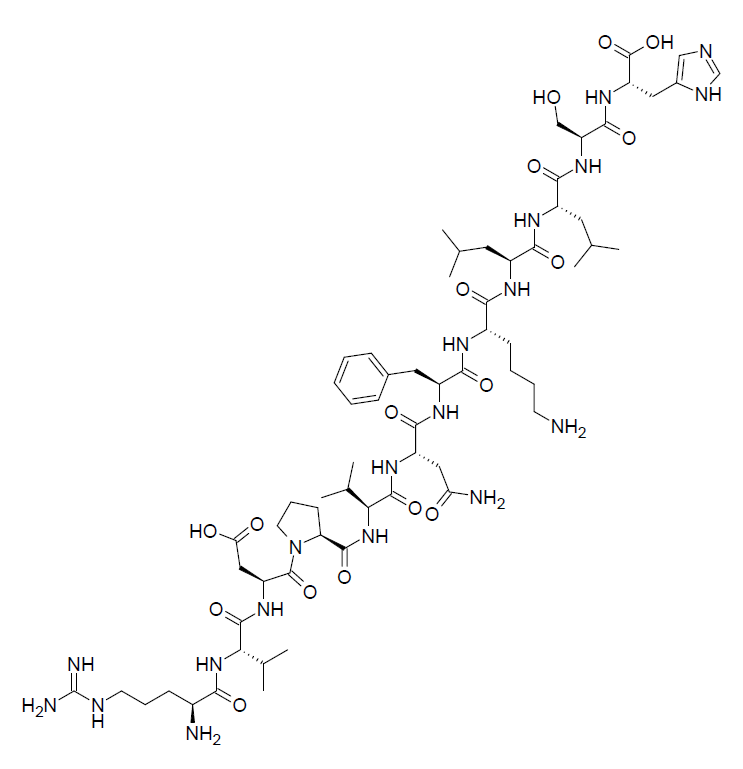
- A polypeptide fragment derived from residues 92-104 (RVDPVNFKLLSH) in the human sequence

Identifiers
- Symbol: HBA1
- CAS number: 1193362-76-3
- NCBI gene: 3039
- HGNC: 4823
- OMIM: 141800
- RefSeq: NM_000558
- UniProt: P69905

Other data
- Locus: Chr. 16 p13.3
Search for
- Structures: Swiss-model
- Domains: InterPro

RVD-Hpα (also known as RVD-hemopressin or Pepcan-12) is an endogenous neuropeptide belonging to the pepcan family of peptide endocannabinoids. It modulates cannabinoid receptor signalling and has been reported to act as a negative allosteric modulator of CB_{1} receptors and a positive allosteric modulator of CB_{2} receptors.

== Structure ==
| species | RVD-Hpα sequence |
|---|---|
| human | RVDPVNFKLLSH |
| mouse | RVDPVNFKLLSH |
| rat | RVDPVNFKfLSH |
| consensus | RVDPVNFKxLSH |

RVD-Hpα is a 12-amino-acid peptide with the sequence Arg-Val-Asp-Pro-Val-Asn-Phe-Lys-Leu-Leu-Ser-His. It is an N-terminally extended form of hemopressin, a nine-amino-acid peptide derived from the α_{1} subunit of hemoglobin. The longer peptide pepcan-23 acts as a precursor and is cleaved to release pepcan-12.

== Function ==
RVD-Hpα was originally proposed to act as a selective agonist of CB_{1} receptors. It is abundant in mouse brain and belongs to a class of peptide cannabinoid ligands distinct from lipid-derived endocannabinoids such as anandamide. By comparison, hemopressin has been reported to act as a CB_{1} inverse agonist.

Subsequent studies characterized RVD-Hpα and other N-terminally extended hemopressin peptides as negative allosteric modulators of CB_{1} receptors. Other studies suggest that its effects on CB_{1} signalling depend on the tissue or experimental conditions, with positive modulatory effects reported in some models. Its effects in these models can be blocked by CB_{1} antagonists.

RVD-Hpα also acts as a positive allosteric modulator of CB_{2} receptors. It potentiates the effects of CB_{2} receptor agonists, including 2-arachidonoylglycerol (2-AG), with five- to tenfold potentiation reported in GTPγS binding and cAMP inhibition assays.

In rodents, pepcan-12 is localized to noradrenergic neurons in the brain, particularly the locus coeruleus and its projections, and to the adrenal medulla. Pepcan-12 and its precursor pepcan-23 have been detected in mouse brain, liver and kidney. Pepcan-12 levels increase during endotoxemia and ischemia–reperfusion injury, conditions in which CB_{2} signalling can have protective effects.

RVD-Hpα also blocks the TRPV1 channel, a target shared with other endocannabinoid ligands, including anandamide and N-Arachidonoyl dopamine.

== Vd-hpα ==
In contrast to RVD-Hpα which produces antagonist or inverse agonist activity at CB_{1} under most conditions but acts as an agonist at CB_{2}, the shorter 11-amino acid peptide fragment VD-Hpα produces agonist effects at CB_{1} but has little or no activity at CB_{2}, producing centrally mediated analgesic effects, hypothermia and increased sleep in animal studies through activation of the CB_{1} receptor. Hybrid peptides combining VD-Hpα with peptide agonists for neuropeptide VF and opioid receptors have also been developed to produce dual acting compounds.
