= Neuropeptide FF receptor 2 =

Protein-coding gene in the species Homo sapiens

NPFFR2

Identifiers
- Aliases: NPFFR2, GPR74, HLWAR77, NPFF2, NPGPR, neuropeptide FF receptor 2
- External IDs: OMIM: 607449; MGI: 1860130; GeneCards: NPFFR2

Gene location (Human)
Chr.	Chromosome 4 (human)
Band	4q13.3	Start	72,031,902 bp
Band	4q13.3	End	72,148,305 bp

Gene location (Mouse)
Chr.	Chromosome 5 (mouse)
Band	5|5 E1	Start	89,675,288 bp
Band	5|5 E1	End	89,731,599 bp
RNA expression pattern
Bgee	Human / Mouse (ortholog); Top expressed in: gonad; testicle; placenta; islet of Langerhans; prefrontal cortex; parietal pleura; gastric mucosa; seminal vesicula; Brodmann area 9; appendix / Top expressed in: primary oocyte; zygote; secondary oocyte; embryo; spinal ganglia; blastocyst; olfactory bulb; mandibular prominence; testicle; trigeminal ganglion; More reference expression data
BioGPS	n/a
Gene ontology
Molecular function	opioid receptor binding; peptide binding; G protein-coupled receptor activity; signal transducer activity; neuropeptide receptor activity
Cellular component	integral component of membrane; plasma membrane; integral component of plasma membrane; membrane; actin cytoskeleton
Biological process	G protein-coupled receptor signaling pathway; detection of abiotic stimulus; cellular response to hormone stimulus; regulation of MAPK cascade; regulation of adenylate cyclase activity; regulation of cAMP-dependent protein kinase activity; signal transduction; response to peptide; neuropeptide signaling pathway
Sources:Amigo / QuickGO
Orthologs
Databases	NCBI: entry; OMA: entry
Species	Human	Mouse
Entrez	10886	104443
Ensembl	ENSG00000056291	ENSMUSG00000035528
UniProt	Q9Y5X5	Q924H0
RefSeq (mRNA)	NM_001144756; NM_004885; NM_053036	NM_133192
RefSeq (protein)	NP_001138228; NP_004876; NP_444264	NP_573455
Location (UCSC)	Chr 4: 72.03 – 72.15 Mb	Chr 5: 89.68 – 89.73 Mb
PubMed search
- Wikidata
View/Edit Human	View/Edit Mouse

Neuropeptide FF receptor 2, also known as NPFF2 and formerly as GPR74, is a human protein encoded by the NPFFR2 gene.

== See also ==
- Neuropeptide FF receptor
