= Neuropeptide FF receptor 1 =

Protein-coding gene in the species Homo sapiens

NPFFR1

Identifiers
- Aliases: NPFFR1, GPR147, NPFF1, NPFF1R1, OT7T022, neuropeptide FF receptor 1
- External IDs: OMIM: 607448; MGI: 2685082; GeneCards: NPFFR1

Gene location (Human)
Chr.	Chromosome 10 (human)
Band	10q22.1	Start	70,247,329 bp
Band	10q22.1	End	70,284,004 bp

Gene location (Mouse)
Chr.	Chromosome 10 (mouse)
Band	10|10 B4	Start	61,431,271 bp
Band	10|10 B4	End	61,464,344 bp
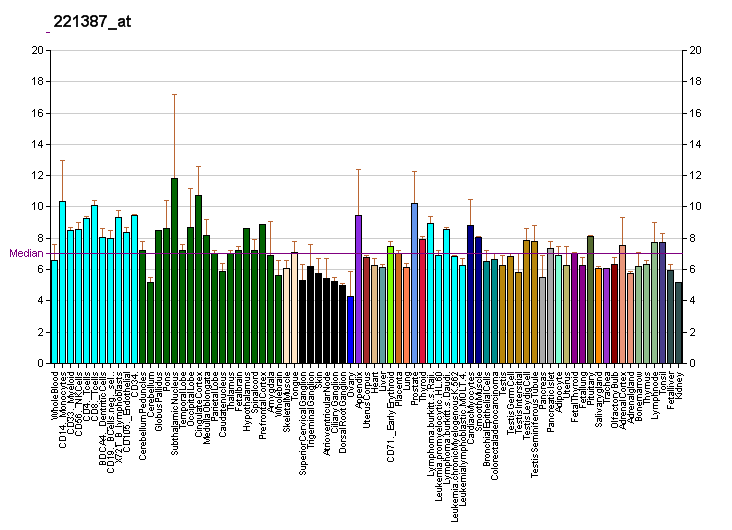
RNA expression pattern
Bgee	Human / Mouse (ortholog); Top expressed in: dorsal motor nucleus of vagus nerve; cerebellar cortex; cerebellar hemisphere; right hemisphere of cerebellum; spinal cord; nucleus accumbens; C1 segment; occipital lobe; hypothalamus; tibial nerve / Top expressed in: dentate gyrus of hippocampal formation granule cell; hypothalamus; hippocampus proper; superior frontal gyrus; primary visual cortex; cerebellar cortex; mesencephalon; striatum of neuraxis; olfactory bulb; spermatid; More reference expression data
BioGPS	More reference expression data
Gene ontology
Molecular function	peptide binding; signal transducer activity; G protein-coupled receptor activity; neuropeptide receptor activity
Cellular component	integral component of membrane; plasma membrane; integral component of plasma membrane; membrane; cilium
Biological process	cellular response to hormone stimulus; signal transduction; response to peptide; neuropeptide signaling pathway; G protein-coupled receptor signaling pathway; biological process
Sources:Amigo / QuickGO
Orthologs
Databases	NCBI: entry; OMA: entry
Species	Human	Mouse
Entrez	64106	237362
Ensembl	ENSG00000148734	ENSMUSG00000020090
UniProt	Q9GZQ6	E9Q468
RefSeq (mRNA)	NM_022146	NM_001177511
RefSeq (protein)	NP_071429	NP_001170982
Location (UCSC)	Chr 10: 70.25 – 70.28 Mb	Chr 10: 61.43 – 61.46 Mb
PubMed search
- Wikidata
View/Edit Human	View/Edit Mouse

Neuropeptide FF receptor 1, also known as NPFF1 and formerly as GPR147, is a human protein, encoded by the NPFFR1 gene.

== See also ==
- Neuropeptide FF receptor
