= INSIG2 =

Protein-coding gene in the species Homo sapiens

Identifiers
- Aliases: INSIG2, INSIG-2, insulin induced gene 2
- External IDs: OMIM: 608660; MGI: 1920249; GeneCards: INSIG2
Available structures
PDB	Ortholog search: PDBe RCSB
PDB	List of PDB id codes 4J82

Gene location (Human)
Chr.	Chromosome 2 (human)
Band	2q14.1-q14.2	Start	118,088,452 bp
Band	2q14.1-q14.2	End	118,110,997 bp

Gene location (Mouse)
Chr.	Chromosome 1 (mouse)
Band	1|1 E2.3	Start	121,232,082 bp
Band	1|1 E2.3	End	121,260,318 bp
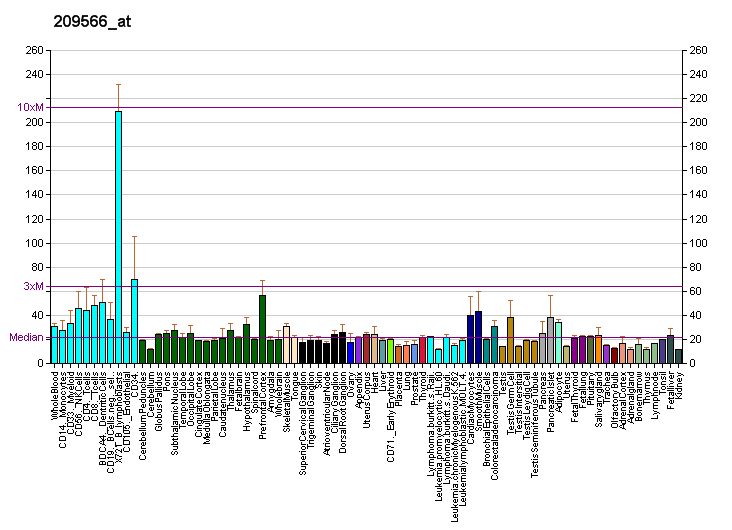
RNA expression pattern
Bgee	Human / Mouse (ortholog); Top expressed in: right coronary artery; right lobe of liver; body of pancreas; islet of Langerhans; tibia; tibial arteries; left coronary artery; ascending aorta; cartilage tissue; Descending thoracic aorta / Top expressed in: interventricular septum; left lobe of liver; iris; ciliary body; retinal pigment epithelium; Epithelium of choroid plexus; sternocleidomastoid muscle; vastus lateralis muscle; skin of external ear; lacrimal gland; More reference expression data
BioGPS	More reference expression data
Gene ontology
Molecular function	transcription factor binding; protein binding
Cellular component	integral component of membrane; SREBP-SCAP-Insig complex; membrane; endoplasmic reticulum; endoplasmic reticulum membrane
Biological process	roof of mouth development; steroid metabolic process; response to fatty acid; sterol biosynthetic process; negative regulation of fatty acid biosynthetic process; lipid metabolism; cholesterol metabolic process; response to sterol depletion; cranial suture morphogenesis; response to insulin; response to lipid; inner ear morphogenesis; middle ear morphogenesis; SREBP signaling pathway; cholesterol biosynthetic process; triglyceride metabolic process; negative regulation of steroid biosynthetic process
Sources:Amigo / QuickGO
Orthologs
Databases	NCBI: entry; OMA: entry
Species	Human	Mouse
Entrez	51141	72999
Ensembl	ENSG00000125629	ENSMUSG00000003721
UniProt	Q9Y5U4	Q91WG1
RefSeq (mRNA)	NM_016133; NM_001321329; NM_001321330; NM_001321331; NM_001321332 NM_001321333	NM_001271531; NM_001271532; NM_133748; NM_178082; NM_001357251
RefSeq (protein)	NP_001308258; NP_001308259; NP_001308260; NP_001308261; NP_001308262 NP_057217	NP_001258460; NP_001258461; NP_598509; NP_835183; NP_001344180
Location (UCSC)	Chr 2: 118.09 – 118.11 Mb	Chr 1: 121.23 – 121.26 Mb
PubMed search
- Wikidata
View/Edit Human	View/Edit Mouse

Insulin induced gene 2, also known as INSIG2, is a protein which in humans is encoded by the INSIG2 gene.

== Regulation ==
Insulin activates the human INSIG2 promoter in a process mediated by phosphorylated SAP1a.

Akt mediates suppression of Insig2a, a liver-specific transcript encoding the SREBP1c inhibitor INSIG2.

MCHR2 has been observed to significantly decrease INSIG2.

Insig2 is upregulated under hypoxic conditions and is associated with the malignant potential of pancreatic cancer.

A novel 1alpha,25-dihydroxyvitamin D3 (1,25-(OH)2D3) response element in the promoter region of Insig-2 gene was identified which specifically binds to the heterodimer of retinoid X receptor and vitamin D receptor (VDR) and directs VDR-mediated transcriptional activation in a 1,25-(OH)2D3-dependent manner. 1,25-(OH)2D3 transiently but strongly induces Insig-2 expression in 3T3-L1 cells. This novel regulatory circuit may also play important roles in other lipogenic cell types that express VDR.

== Function ==
The protein encoded by this gene is highly similar to the protein product encoded by gene INSIG1. Both INSIG1 protein and this protein are endoplasmic reticulum proteins that block the processing of sterol regulatory element–binding proteins (SREBPs) by binding to SREBP cleavage–activating protein (SCAP), and thus prevent SCAP from escorting SREBPs to the Golgi.

== Clinical significance ==
Insig deficiency in mice caused a marked buildup of cholesterol precursors in skin associated with a marked increase in 3-hydroxy-3-methylglutaryl coenzyme A reductase protein and hair and skin defects corrected by topical simvastatin, an inhibitor of reductase.

REV-ERBalpha participates in the circadian modulation of sterol regulatory element-binding protein (SREBP) activity, and thereby in the daily expression of SREBP target genes involved in cholesterol and lipid metabolism. This control is exerted via the cyclic transcription of Insig2, encoding a trans-membrane protein that sequesters SREBP proteins to the endoplasmic reticulum membranes and thereby interferes with the proteolytic activation of SREBPs in Golgi membranes. REV-ERBalpha also participates in the cyclic expression of cholesterol-7alpha-hydroxylase (CYP7A1), the rate-limiting enzyme in converting cholesterol to bile acids. Findings suggest that this control acts via the stimulation of LXR nuclear receptors by cyclically produced oxysterols such that rhythmic cholesterol and bile acid metabolism is not just driven by alternating feeding-fasting cycles, but also by REV-ERBalpha, a component of the circadian clockwork circuitry.

Silibinin inhibits adipocyte differentiation through a potential up-regulation of insig-1 and insig-2 at an early phase in adipocyte differentiation.

The triacylglycerol reducing effect of fibrates and thiazolidinediones, strong and selective agonists of PPARalpha and PPARgamma, is partially caused by inhibition of SREBP-1 activation via up-regulation of Insig.

Findings suggest that Insig2 is a novel colon cancer biomarker. Over-expression of Insig2 appeared to suppress chemotherapeutic drug treatment-induced Bcl2-associated X protein (Bax) expression and activation. Insig2 was also found to localize to the mitochondria/heavy membrane fraction and associate with conformationally changed Bax. Moreover, Insig2 altered the expression of several additional apoptosis genes located in mitochondria.

In a study by Kumar et al., a common polymorphism ahead of the INSIG2 gene, rs756605, was not found to be significantly associated with obesity in an Indian population.
