= PAQR3 =

Identifiers
- Aliases: PAQR3, RKTG, progestin and adipoQ receptor family member 3
- External IDs: OMIM: 614577; MGI: 2679683; GeneCards: PAQR3

Gene location (Human)
| Chr. | Chromosome 4 (human) |
| Band | 4q21.21 | Start | 78,887,127 bp |
| Band | 4q21.21 | End | 78,939,438 bp |

Gene location (Mouse)
| Chr. | Chromosome 5 (mouse) |
| Band | 5|5 E3 | Start | 97,230,188 bp |
| Band | 5|5 E3 | End | 97,259,455 bp |
RNA expression pattern
| Bgee | Human / Mouse (ortholog); Top expressed in: sperm; jejunal mucosa; right testis; left testis; ganglionic eminence; testicle; skin of thigh; ventricular zone; Epithelium of choroid plexus; gonad / Top expressed in: ganglionic eminence; lens; mesencephalon; hippocampus proper; rhombencephalon; dentate gyrus of hippocampal formation granule cell; striatum of neuraxis; cerebellum; neural tube; spermatocyte; More reference expression data |
| BioGPS | n/a |
Gene ontology
| Molecular function | protein binding; signaling receptor activity |
| Cellular component | integral component of membrane; Golgi apparatus; membrane; Golgi membrane |
| Biological process | negative regulation of protein phosphorylation; negative regulation of neuron projection development; MAPK cascade; negative regulation of MAP kinase activity; negative regulation of peptidyl-serine phosphorylation; protein localization to Golgi apparatus |
Sources:Amigo / QuickGO
Orthologs
| Databases | NCBI: entry; OMA: entry |
| Species | Human | Mouse |
| Entrez | 152559 | 231474 |
| Ensembl | ENSG00000163291 | ENSMUSG00000055725 |
| UniProt | Q6TCH7 | Q6TCG8 |
| RefSeq (mRNA) | NM_001040202; NM_177453; NM_001350105; NM_001350106 | NM_198422; NM_001359910; NM_001359913 |
| RefSeq (protein) | NP_001035292; NP_001337034; NP_001337035 | NP_940814; NP_001346839; NP_001346842 |
| Location (UCSC) | Chr 4: 78.89 – 78.94 Mb | Chr 5: 97.23 – 97.26 Mb |
| PubMed search |
- Wikidata
| View/Edit Human | View/Edit Mouse |

Progestin and adipoQ receptor family member 3 (PAQR3), or Raf Kinase Trapping to Golgi apparatus (RKTG) is a protein that in humans is encoded by the PAQR3 gene. It is a member of the progestin and adipoQ receptor (PAQR) family. PAQR3 is predicted to have seven transmembrane helices and to be localized to the Golgi Apparatus. It functions as a tumor suppressor by negatively regulating tumor cell proliferation and migration by inhibiting Raf kinase and AKT pathway. PAQR3 was also shown to modulate cholesterol homeostasis by anchoring the SCAP/SREBP complex to the Golgi under cholesterol depletion conditions.
