= Sterol-sensing domain =

A sterol-sensing domain (SSD) is a protein domain which consists of 180 amino acids forming five transmembrane segments capable of binding sterol groups. This type of domain is present in proteins involved in cholesterol metabolism and signalling.

== Function ==
Sterol-sensing domains are present in various proteins involved in key aspects of cholesterol homeostasis and signalling. Multiple sequence alignments using Clustal W have shown that these proteins can be grouped in seven different families according to their SSDs. The following SSD-containing proteins represent each family:

- HMG-CoA reductase (HMGCR), involved in the biosynthesis of cholesterol. This was the first protein with an SSD to be discovered. Upon binding to cholesterol, this protein undergoes endoplasmic-reticulum-associated protein degradation. The SSD is not required for the catalytic activity of HMGCR.
- SREBP cleavage-activating protein (SCAP), which regulates transcription of genes with sterol response elements by proteolytically activating sterol regulatory element-binding proteins (SREBPs). This was the second SSD-containing protein to be discovered.
- 7-dehydrocholesterol reductase (7DHCR), involved in the last step of cholesterol biosynthesis.
- Niemann-Pick type C1 (NPC1), involved in intracellular cholesterol transport.
  - Niemann-Pick type C1-like 1 (NPC1L1), a regulator of cholesterol absorption in enterocytes.
- Patched (PTCH1, PTCH2), involved in the hedgehog signaling pathway and also cytokinesis. Its SSD binds the cholesterol moiety of hedgehog, and it is essential for its activity.
- Dispatched (DISP1, DISP2, DISP3), also involved in hedgehog signaling. DISP is required for the secretion of hedgehog.
- Patched-related protein (PTR), structurally similar to patched. Its functions are not fully understood.

== Disease ==
Mutations in 7DHCR are linked to Smith–Lemli–Opitz syndrome (SLOS). Mutations in NPC1 have been shown to cause Niemann–Pick disease, type C. Mutations in patched are associated with a variety of cancers (basal cell carcinoma, medulloblastoma, rhabdomyosarcoma).

== See also ==
- INSIG-1
