= SNAP-7941 =

Chemical compound

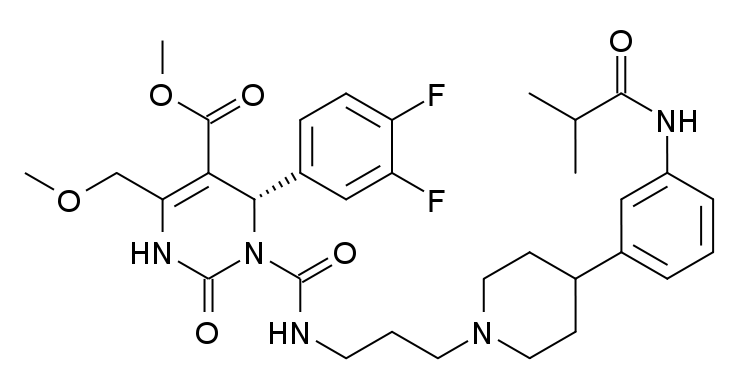

Identifiers
- CAS Number: 387825-78-7
- PubChem CID: 11520239
- ChemSpider: 9695027
- ChEMBL: ChEMBL185271
- CompTox Dashboard (EPA): DTXSID101028551

Chemical and physical data
- Formula: C_{33}H_{41}F_{2}N_{5}O_{6}
- Molar mass: 641.717 g·mol^{−1}
- 3D model (JSmol): Interactive image
- SMILES: CC(C)C(=O)Nc(c4)cccc4C3CCN(CC3)CCCNC(=O)N(C(=O)NC=1COC)C(C=1C(=O)OC)c(cc2F)ccc2F
- InChI: InChI=1S/C31H37F2N5O6/c1-19(39)35-23-7-4-6-21(16-23)20-10-14-37(15-11-20)13-5-12-34-30(41)38-28(22-8-9-24(32)25(33)17-22)27(29(40)44-3)26(18-43-2)36-31(38)42/h4,6-9,16-17,20,28H,5,10-15,18H2,1-3H3,(H,34,41)(H,35,39)(H,36,42)/t28-/m0/s1; Key:FWMHZWMPUWAUPL-NDEPHWFRSA-N

SNAP-7941 is a drug used in scientific research, which is a selective, non-peptide antagonist at the melanin concentrating hormone receptor MCH_{1}. In initial animal studies it had promising anxiolytic, antidepressant and anorectic effects, but subsequent trial results were disappointing, and the main significance of SNAP-7941 is as the lead compound from which more potent and selective antagonists such as SNAP-94847 were developed, although it continues to be used for research into the function of the MCH_{1} receptor.
