= Insulin-induced gene 1 protein =

Protein found in humans

INSIG1

Identifiers
- Aliases: INSIG1, CL-6, CL6, insulin induced gene 1
- External IDs: OMIM: 602055; MGI: 1916289; GeneCards: INSIG1
Available structures
PDB	Ortholog search: PDBe RCSB
PDB	List of PDB id codes 4J81

Gene location (Human)
Chr.	Chromosome 7 (human)
Band	7q36.3	Start	155,297,776 bp
Band	7q36.3	End	155,310,235 bp

Gene location (Mouse)
Chr.	Chromosome 5 (mouse)
Band	5|5 B1	Start	28,276,361 bp
Band	5|5 B1	End	28,283,660 bp
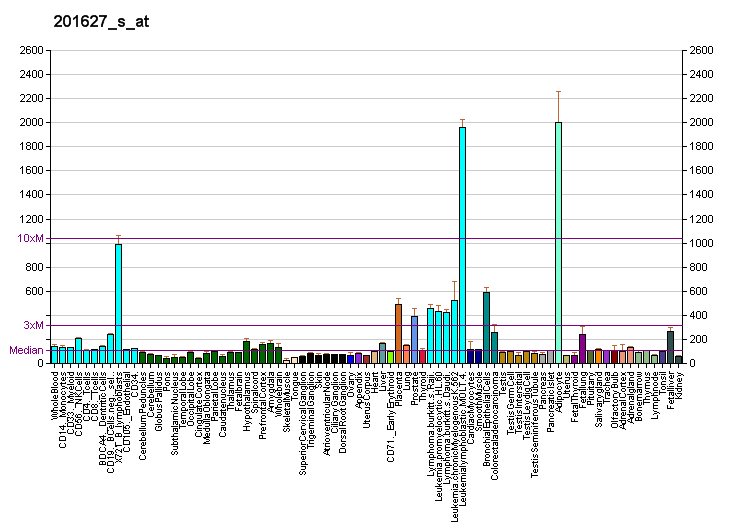

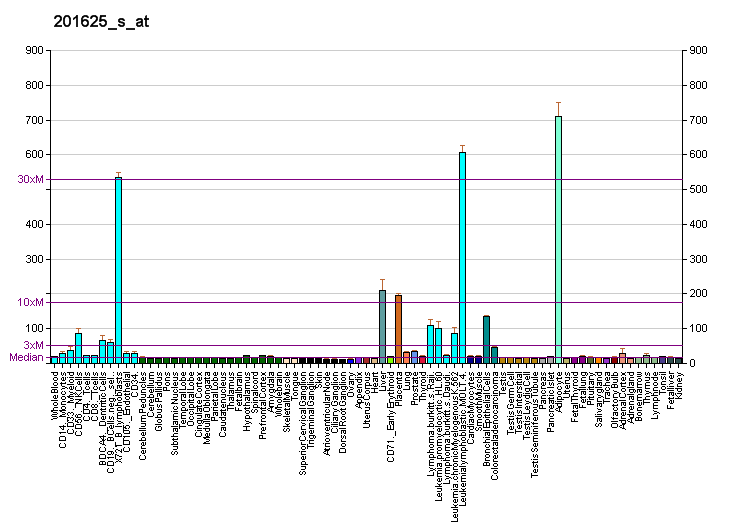

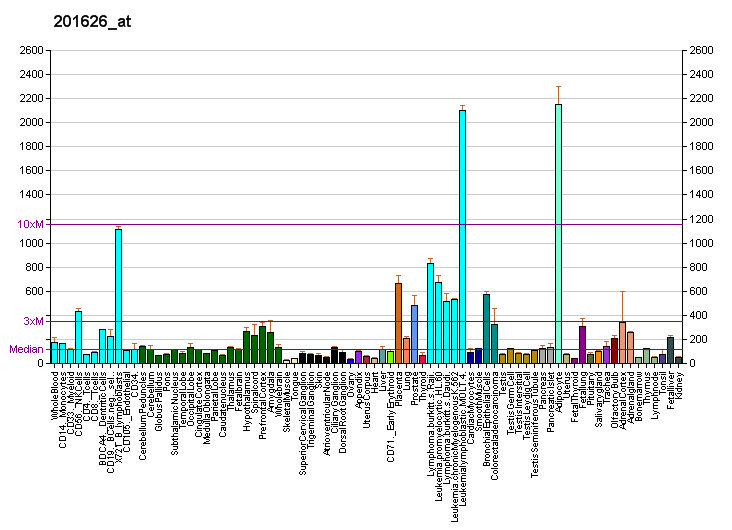
RNA expression pattern
Bgee	Human / Mouse (ortholog); Top expressed in: cartilage tissue; right lobe of liver; skin of thigh; Epithelium of choroid plexus; superior vestibular nucleus; mucosa of paranasal sinus; retinal pigment epithelium; islet of Langerhans; secondary oocyte; tibia / Top expressed in: epithelium of small intestine; secondary oocyte; migratory enteric neural crest cell; ciliary body; left lobe of liver; parotid gland; olfactory epithelium; submandibular gland; genital tubercle; cumulus cell; More reference expression data
BioGPS	More reference expression data
Gene ontology
Molecular function	protein binding
Cellular component	integral component of membrane; SREBP-SCAP-Insig complex; endoplasmic reticulum membrane; membrane; endoplasmic reticulum
Biological process	roof of mouth development; steroid metabolic process; negative regulation of fat cell differentiation; sterol biosynthetic process; negative regulation of fatty acid biosynthetic process; lipid metabolism; cholesterol metabolic process; response to sterol depletion; cranial suture morphogenesis; negative regulation of cargo loading into COPII-coated vesicle; inner ear morphogenesis; middle ear morphogenesis; SREBP signaling pathway; cholesterol biosynthetic process; cell population proliferation; triglyceride metabolic process; negative regulation of steroid biosynthetic process; cellular response to sterol; SREBP-SCAP complex retention in endoplasmic reticulum; cholesterol homeostasis; negative regulation of protein exit from endoplasmic reticulum
Sources:Amigo / QuickGO
Orthologs
Databases	NCBI: entry; OMA: entry
Species	Human	Mouse
Entrez	3638	231070
Ensembl	ENSG00000186480	ENSMUSG00000045294
UniProt	O15503	Q8BGI3
RefSeq (mRNA)	NM_001346590; NM_001346591; NM_001346592; NM_001346593; NM_001346594 NM_005542; NM_198336; NM_198337	NM_153526
RefSeq (protein)	NP_001333519; NP_001333520; NP_001333521; NP_001333522; NP_001333523 NP_005533; NP_938150; NP_938151	NP_705746
Location (UCSC)	Chr 7: 155.3 – 155.31 Mb	Chr 5: 28.28 – 28.28 Mb
PubMed search
- Wikidata
View/Edit Human	View/Edit Mouse

Insulin induced gene 1, also known as INSIG1, is a protein which in humans is encoded by the INSIG1 gene.

INSIG1 is short for insulin-induced gene 1; it is located on chromosome 7 (7q36). This human gene encodes for a transmembrane protein of 277 amino acids with probably 6 transmembrane domains. It is localized in the endoplasmic reticulum (ER) and seems to be expressed in all tissues, especially in liver. This gene is called an insulin-induced gene because the molecule insulin can regulate it. Importantly, the protein encoded by this gene plays a critical role in regulating cholesterol concentrations in cells.

== Function ==
1. INSIG1 plays an important role in the SREBP-mediated regulation of cholesterol biosynthesis: by binding to the sterol-sensing domain of SCAP (SREBP cleavage activating protein) it makes the SCAP/SREBP complex stay longer in the ER, thus prohibiting SCAP from carrying activated SREBP to the golgi complex. This ultimately blocks SREBP from acting as a transcription factor for the SRE in the promoter region of the HMG-CoA-reductase gene and results in a decreased expression of HMG-CoA-reductase.
2. INSIG1 also binds to the sterol-sensing domain of HMG-CoA-reductase, resulting in the enzyme's increased degradation.

Both functions require the binding of INSIG1 protein via the same site.

There are two other proteins whose sterol-binding sites show a great similarity to the ones of SCAP and HMG-CoA-reductase and who might thus be regulated by INSIG1 as well:

- Niemann-Pick disease type C1 protein, which participates in the intracellular movement of cholesterol
- Patched, the receptor for Hedgehog, a protein that contains covalently bound cholesterol

Oxysterols regulate cholesterol homeostasis through liver X receptor (LXR) and sterol regulatory element-binding protein (SREBP) mediated signaling pathway. This protein binds to the sterol-sensing domains of SREBP cleavage-activating protein (SCAP) and HMG CoA reductase, and is essential for the sterol-mediated trafficking of the two proteins. Alternatively spliced transcript variants encoding distinct isoforms have been observed.

== Regulation ==
INSIG1 is regulated by insulin and highly expressed in liver.

== Sequence (277 AA) ==
MPRLHDHFWS CSCAHSARRR GPPRASTAGL PPKVGEMINV SVSGPSLLAA HGAPDADPAP RGRSAAMSGP EPGSPYPNTW HHRLLQRSLV LFSVGVVLAL VLNLLQIQRN VTLFPEEVIA TIFSSAWWVP PCCGTAAAVV GLLYPCIDSH LGEPHKFKRE WASVMRCIAV FVGINHASAK LDFANNVQLS LTLAALSLGL WWTFDRSRSG LGLGITIAFL ATLITQFLVY NGVYQYTSPD FLYIRSWLPC IFFSGGVTVG NIGRQLAMGV PEKPHSD

== Synonyms ==
CL-6, INSIG-1, Insulin-induced gene 1 protein, MGC1405 (source: iHOP)

== Interactions ==
INSIG1 has been shown to interact with SREBF2.
