= Zinc finger protein 229 =

Protein found in humans

ZNF229

Identifiers
- Aliases: ZNF229, zinc finger protein 229
- External IDs: GeneCards: ZNF229

Gene location (Human)
Chr.	Chromosome 19 (human)
Band	19q13.31	Start	44,417,519 bp
Band	19q13.31	End	44,448,578 bp
RNA expression pattern
Bgee	Human / Mouse (ortholog); Top expressed in: gonad; testicle; ventricular zone; ganglionic eminence; islet of Langerhans; secondary oocyte; stromal cell of endometrium; retinal pigment epithelium; smooth muscle tissue; germinal epithelium / n/a; More reference expression data
BioGPS	n/a
Gene ontology
Molecular function	DNA-binding transcription factor activity; DNA binding; metal ion binding; nucleic acid binding; DNA-binding transcription factor activity, RNA polymerase II-specific
Cellular component	intracellular anatomical structure; nucleus
Biological process	regulation of transcription, DNA-templated; transcription, DNA-templated; regulation of transcription by RNA polymerase II
Sources:Amigo / QuickGO
Orthologs
Databases	NCBI: entry; OMA: entry
Species	Human	Mouse
Entrez	7772	n/a
Ensembl	ENSG00000278318	n/a
UniProt	Q9UJW7	n/a
RefSeq (mRNA)	NM_001278510; NM_014518	n/a
RefSeq (protein)	NP_001265439; NP_055333	n/a
Location (UCSC)	Chr 19: 44.42 – 44.45 Mb	n/a
PubMed search		n/a
- Wikidata
View/Edit Human

Zinc finger protein 229 is a protein that in humans is encoded by the ZNF229 gene. The ZNF229 gene is involved in regulating transcription as it can bind to DNA, either inhibiting or promoting transcription.

== Gene ==
This gene is located on chromosome 19 (19p13.31) spanning 22,219 base pairs on the minus strand of DNA. There are 6 exons in total.

== RNA ==
The longest isoform (transcript variant 1) of the ZNF229 gene has an mRNA transcript length of 4,956 nucleotides, which encode 7 exons. There is one other isoform, transcription variant 2, which differs in the 5' UTR region and at the end of exon 5. This isoform has 4,832 nucleotides and is slightly shorter than isoform 1.

== Protein ==
Transcription variant 1 of ZNF229 encodes a protein that is 825 amino acids in length. Isoform 2 of ZNF229 encodes a protein made up of 819 amino acids that does not include the last 6 amino acids of exon 5 that are observed in isoform 1. The molecular weight is approximately 93 kDa and the isoelectric point is 8.88 pH. The zinc finger protein 229 has a Kruppel-associated box domain (KRAB) at the N-terminus and 17 C2H2 domains (20 amino acids long) at the C-terminus. The KRAB domain is important for transcription repression of ZNF229. In the C2H2 zinc finger domains, there are two cysteines at the beginning and two histidines at the end that allow the protein to bind to the metal zinc ion. This bond with zinc stabilizes the protein's secondary structure as they form two beta sheets and an alpha helix. As observed in other zinc fingers, the alpha helix can then bind to DNA in the major groove, allowing the protein to regulate transcription.

== Gene level regulation ==
The ZNF229 gene is mainly expressed in the thyroid, ovaries, and brain in adult humans. ZNF229 is ubiquitously expressed in human fetal development.

== Protein level regulation ==
ZNF229 does not have a transmembrane domain or signal sequence. Most zinc fingers are found in the nucleus, but ZNF229 was found to be in vesicles of human cells in one antibody study. There are other cases of zinc fingers being found outside the nucleus like ZFP36 and TNFAIP3.

== Paralogs ==
The Zinc Finger Protein family is large and the human ZNF229 protein has many paralogs. These are 5 paralogs of ZNF229 that range in identity from 46-52%.

Paralogs	Identity	Similarity	Accession #	Sequence length (aa)	Chromosome location
ZNF229	100%	100%	NP_055333.3	845	19q13.31 (44426254..44448578)
ZNF658	52%	68%	NP_001304845.1	1059	9q21.11
ZNF208	49%	64%	KAI2590044.1	1167	19p12
ZNF227	49%	62%	NP_001276102.1	771	19q13.31 (44207547..44237268)
ZNF836	44%	58%	NP_001096127.1	936	19q13.41
ZNF112	46%	57%	NP_001335210.1	930	19q13.31 (44326553..44367217)

== Orthologs ==
There are orthologs of the ZNF229 human gene found in nearly all life forms. Some ortholog groups include mammals (identity of 45%), reptiles (42-46%), birds (52-56%), fish (47-54%), invertebrates (39-54%), fungi (46-55%), plants (31-39%), and bacteria (34-51%). ZNF229 did not have any significant orthologs in archaea.

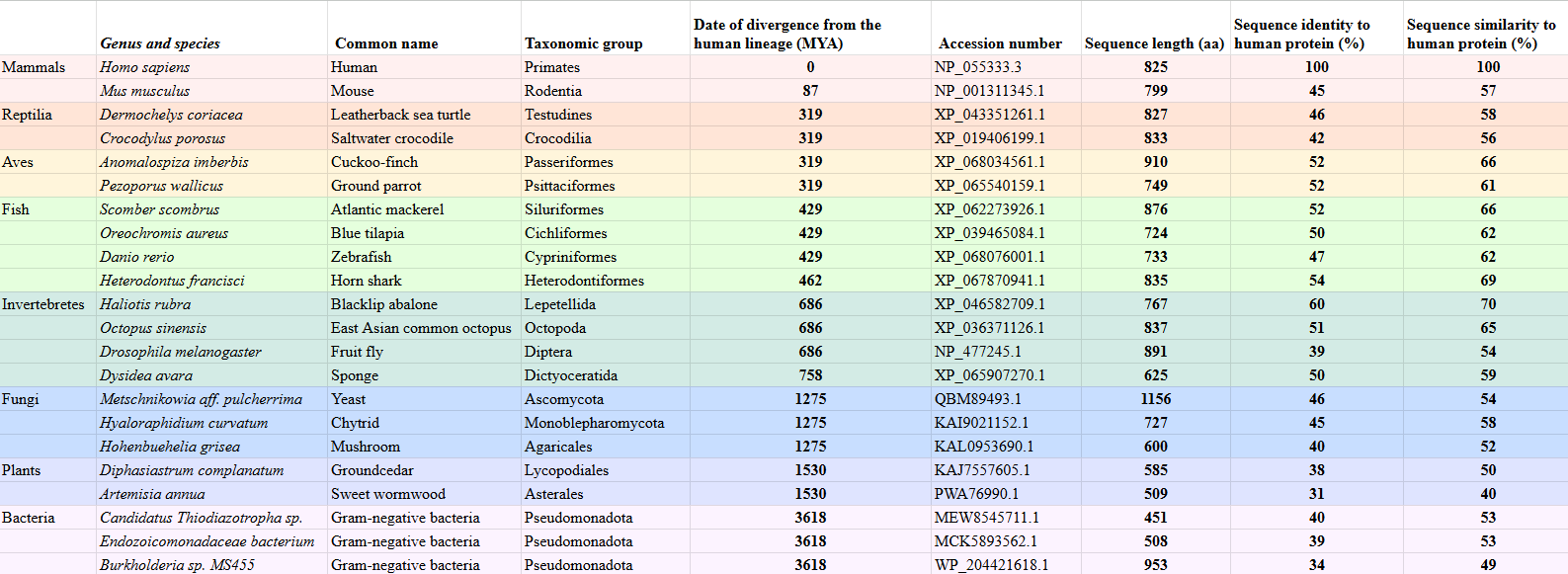
This ortholog table for the human ZNF229 protein is first sorted by date of divergence, then sequence identity, and finally sequence similarity to the human ZNF229 protein.

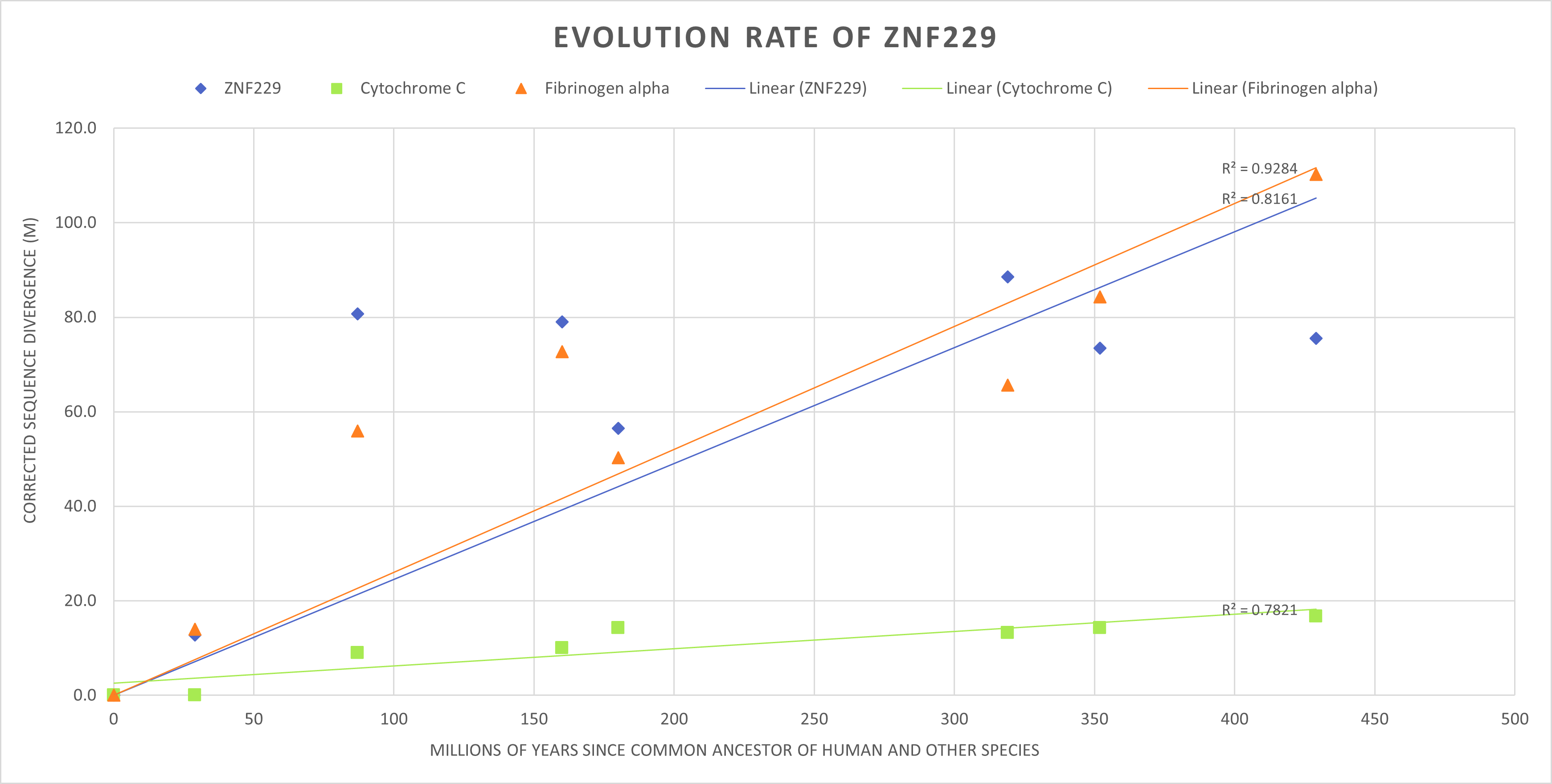
Graph of the mutation rate of the human ZNF229 gene over 1400 million years as compared to the human genes, cytochrome c and the fibrinogen alpha. The human ZNF229 gene has a similar evolution rate as the human fibrinogen alpha gene, which is considered to have a relatively faster rate of evolution compared to other genes in the human genome.

== Interacting proteins ==
The TRIM28 protein is predicted to bind to ZNF229 based an affinity capture-MS experiment; this is logical as TRIM28 binds to the KRAB domain, which ZNF229 contains, and acts as a corepressor.

== Clinical significance ==
From GEO Profiles, a study that examined gene expression in estrogen receptor alpha-silenced MCF7 breast cancer cell lines and normal MCF7 cell line found that ZNF229 was expressed at low levels. There is a predicted transcription factor, SREBF2, found upstream of the ZNF229 gene where estrogen regulates the expression of this transcription factor.
