= Alazami syndrome =

Rare genetic disorder

Alazami syndrome is a rare autosomal recessive genetic disorder characterized by short stature, severe developmental delays, speech delay, skeletal deformities, intellectual disability, and distinctive facial features (facial dysmorphisms). Facial features include underdevelopment of the cheekbones, deep-set eyes, broad nose and an enlargement at the corners of the mouth (macrostomia). Skeletal deformities include scoliosis and mild epiphyseal changes in the first bones of the fingers (proximal phalanges), but no severe hip dislocation. It was first described by Alazami et al in 2012. The syndrome was presented by a Saudi Arabian family with primordial dwarfism syndrome with LARP7 gene variations. Some affected patients show the lack of voluntary coordination of muscle movements (ataxia), manifested as a clumsy walking pattern, with frequent trips or falls.

== Causes ==
The genetic cause of the syndrome is the deletion of LARP7 gene (La ribonucleoprotein 7) located on chromosome 4q25. The gene expresses a small nuclear ribonucleoprotein that hinders a transcription factor required for resuming transcription by RNA polymerase II enzyme. LARP7 loss-of-function mutations in humans suffer from primordial dwarfism, intellectual disabilities, and facial characteristics changes. Several Alazami syndrome patients show a reduced telomerase activity and very short lymphocyte telomeres. Even though thyroid cancer is rare among children and adolescents, those with this disease are LARP7 variants and have Alazami syndrome and tumor susceptibility.
