= PMCH =

PMCH might refer to:

- Patna Medical College and Hospital
- Melanin-concentrating hormone, which official gene name is PMCH
