= NGD =

NGD may refer to

- Project 18, India's Next Generation Destroyer
- New Guinea Dingo, New Guinea Singing Dog
- Non-Good Delivery gold or silver bars
- NGD Studios, a game development company
- NGD-4715, a drug
- New Gibraltar Democracy, a political party
- Newport Gwent Dragons, a Welsh rugby union club
- Auguste George Airport (IATA code NGD)
