= SOFT syndrome =

- Other names: Short stature-onychodysplasia-facial dysmorphism-hypotrichosis syndrome
- This condition is inherited following an autosomal recessive manner.
- Specialty: Medical genetics
- Causes: Genetic mutation

SOFT syndrome, also known for the name its acronym originates from: Short stature-onychodysplasia-facial dysmorphism-hypotrichosis syndrome, is a rare genetic disorder characterized by the presence of short stature, underdeveloped nails, facial dysmorphisms (such as long triangular face, down-slanting palpebral fissures, etc.), and hair sparcity across the body. It is caused by homozygous, autosomal recessive mutations in the POC1A gene, located in the short arm of chromosome 3. Fewer than 15 cases have been described in the medical literature.

== History ==
=== 1992 ===
This condition was first discovered in the first day of March 1992 by Doctors P. D. Turnpenny and R. J. Thwaites in Israel, their case was a 14 month old infant girl who was born to consanguineous parents. Her symptoms included motor delay, frontal hairline balding, rhizomelic shortening of the limbs which in turn caused short stature, macrocephaly, small nose, hypertrophy of the gingiva, underdeveloped midface, macrostomia, severe underdevelopment of the clitoris, and down-facing corners of the mouth. Radiological findings included a thorax whose shape resembled that of a dome and humerofemoral ossification delay. There were no other skeletal anomalies.

=== 2012 ===
Shalev et al. reported 8 patients with the condition, 7 of which had not been previously described in the medical literature beforehand and thus were considered as new cases, these cases belonged to a large consanguineous Israeli kindred of Arab Muslim ancestry. Final adult height for these patients ranged from 112 to 127 cm tall. Findings which were supposedly present during the patient's youth were large, long, triangular head with short stature, these phenotypical features would change once a person started getting older and in adulthood the patients would have long, pointy chins as well as a relatively small head size. They had other symptoms, including small ears and hands, brachydactyly, clinodactyly, unstable gait described as "waddling", fingernail hypoplasia, hair loss/sparcity across the body starting with post-pubertal onset, and an abnormally high-pitched voice. Radiological findings included mild metaphyseal dysplasia and shortening of the humeral and femoral bone, with severe shortening of the femoral necks. Other symptoms included adult-onset diabetes mellitus type 2 (two males from a different family each), oligoazoospermia (same two males), lack of axillary hair (one female from one of the families), breast hypoplasia (same female), and dental anomalies, such as caries and cone-shaped incisors. (3 affected members from all 2 of the families).

Sharig et al. did chromosomal mapping on affected members from the families which were previously reported by Shalev et al. They found two possible locuses, one in chromosome 4 that spanned over 3.7 M-b, and another one in chromosome 3 that spanned just over 7.3 M-b. Fine mapping followed by haplotype analysis narrowed down the possible disease locus to a 2 M-b interval in chromosome 3p21 which spanned from genetic marker D3S1573 to genetic marker rs2279323. Exome sequencing done on them afterwards showed a mutation (L171P) in their POC1A gene.

Shaheen et al. reported 5 patients from 3 separate consanguineous Saudi Arabian families. Findings in the children (other than the usual facial dysmorphisms and rhizomelic shortening of the limbs) included high forehead, hypertelorism, depressed nasal bridge, broad, upfacing nose, posteriorly rotated low-set ears, long philtrum (two sisters and one of their male cousins, from the first family), deep-set eyes, prominence of the columella, hypotonia (one 6-year-old boy, from the second family). Radiological findings included severe epiphyseal hypoplasia affecting the humerus and the femur, shortening and broadening of the metacarpals, metatarsals, tarsals, and carpals, bone age delayed by 2 years, and diffuse osteopenia (in a 2-year-old male, from the third family). Exome sequencing done on 4 of the 5 patients showed a different, shared homozygous mutation (R81X) in their POC1A gene. Haplotype analysis showed that they shared the same ancestral disease haplotype.
