= Melanin-concentrating hormone receptor 1 =

Protein-coding gene in the species Homo sapiens

MCHR1

Identifiers
- Aliases: MCHR1, GPR24, MCH-1R, MCH1R, SLC-1, SLC1, melanin concentrating hormone receptor 1
- External IDs: OMIM: 601751; MGI: 2180756; GeneCards: MCHR1

Gene location (Human)
Chr.	Chromosome 22 (human)
Band	22q13.2	Start	40,679,273 bp
Band	22q13.2	End	40,682,812 bp

Gene location (Mouse)
Chr.	Chromosome 15 (mouse)
Band	15|15 E1	Start	81,119,700 bp
Band	15|15 E1	End	81,123,165 bp
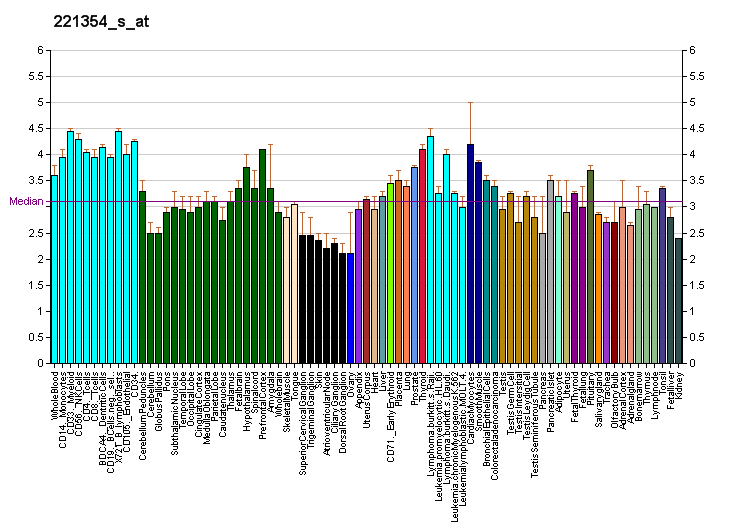
RNA expression pattern
Bgee	Human / Mouse (ortholog); Top expressed in: endothelial cell; middle temporal gyrus; Brodmann area 23; prefrontal cortex; superior frontal gyrus; entorhinal cortex; postcentral gyrus; primary visual cortex; dorsolateral prefrontal cortex; cingulate gyrus / Top expressed in: lumbar subsegment of spinal cord; Paneth cell; superior frontal gyrus; Region I of hippocampus proper; facial motor nucleus; primary visual cortex; substantia nigra; dentate gyrus of hippocampal formation granule cell; nucleus accumbens; dorsal striatum; More reference expression data
BioGPS	More reference expression data
Gene ontology
Molecular function	G protein-coupled receptor activity; signal transducer activity; melanin-concentrating hormone receptor activity; neuropeptide receptor activity; signaling receptor binding; protein C-terminus binding; hormone binding; neuropeptide binding; peptide binding
Cellular component	integral component of membrane; plasma membrane; integral component of plasma membrane; membrane; ciliary membrane; non-motile cilium; cilium
Biological process	G protein-coupled receptor signaling pathway; neuropeptide signaling pathway; adenylate cyclase-inhibiting G protein-coupled receptor signaling pathway; generation of precursor metabolites and energy; feeding behavior; signal transduction; chemical synaptic transmission; cell surface receptor signaling pathway; positive regulation of cytosolic calcium ion concentration; positive regulation of calcium ion transport
Sources:Amigo / QuickGO
Orthologs
Databases	NCBI: entry; OMA: entry
Species	Human	Mouse
Entrez	2847	207911
Ensembl	ENSG00000128285	ENSMUSG00000050164
UniProt	Q99705	Q8JZL2
RefSeq (mRNA)	NM_005297	NM_145132
RefSeq (protein)	NP_005288	NP_660114
Location (UCSC)	Chr 22: 40.68 – 40.68 Mb	Chr 15: 81.12 – 81.12 Mb
PubMed search
- Wikidata
View/Edit Human	View/Edit Mouse

Melanin-concentrating hormone receptor 1, also known as MCH_{1}, is one of the melanin-concentrating hormone receptors found in all mammals.

The protein encoded by this gene, a member of the G protein-coupled receptor family 1, is an integral plasma membrane protein which binds melanin-concentrating hormone. The encoded protein can inhibit cAMP accumulation and stimulate intracellular calcium flux, and is probably involved in the neuronal regulation of food consumption. Although structurally similar to somatostatin receptors, this protein does not seem to bind somatostatin.

== Function ==
MCH_{1} is thought to have a number of functions including in the regulation of appetite, and in stress, anxiety and depression.

== Selective ligands ==
=== Agonists ===
- Melanin concentrating hormone (MCH)
- S-36057 - modified MCH 6-13 fragment substituted with 3-iodotyrosine at N-terminus via dioxyoctanoyl linker, used as ^{125}I radioligand for mapping MCH_{1} in vivo.
- LK-184 (Procter & Gamble) is one pick

=== Antagonists ===
- ATC-0065
- ATC-0175
- GW-803,430
- NGD-4715
- SNAP-7941
- SNAP-94847
- T-226,296

== See also ==
- Melanin-concentrating hormone receptor
