= Ichthyosis follicularis with alopecia and photophobia syndrome =

IFAP syndrome
- Ichthyosis follicularis with alopecia and photophobia syndrome is inherited via X-linked recessive manner(though other forms of inheritance have occurred)
- Specialty: Medical genetics

Ichthyosis follicularis, alopecia, and photophobia (IFAP) syndrome is an extremely rare genetic syndrome caused by mutations in the MBTPS2 gene. It is extremely rare: there were only 40 known cases (all male) until 2011.

== Symptoms and signs ==
The main symptoms are given by its name: dry, scaly skin (ichthyosis), absence of hair (atrichia) and excessive sensitivity to light (photophobia). Additional features include short stature, mental retardation, seizures and a tendency for respiratory infections.

== Genetics ==
Most cases are X-linked recessive but there may be as many as three types. As well as a classical X-linked form, there is another type where females are partially affected and another where females have full IFAP symptoms. It is caused by mutations in the MBTPS2 gene.

== Diagnosis ==
Diagnosis is based on appearance and family history. KID syndrome or keratosis follicularis spinulosa decalvans have some similar symptoms and must be eliminated.

== See also ==
- Cicatricial alopecia
- List of cutaneous conditions
