= Membrane-bound transcription factor site-2 protease =

Class of enzymes

Membrane-bound transcription factor peptidase, site 2

Identifiers
- Aliases: MBTPS2, BRESEK, IFAP, KFSD, KFSDX, OLMSX, S2P, membrane bound transcription factor peptidase, site 2, OI19
- External IDs: OMIM: 300294; MGI: 2444506; HomoloGene: 9287; GeneCards: MBTPS2; OMA:MBTPS2 - orthologs

Gene location (Human)
Chr.	X chromosome (human)
Band	Xp22.12	Start	21,839,617 bp
Band	Xp22.12	End	21,885,423 bp

Gene location (Mouse)
Chr.	X chromosome (mouse)
Band	X|X F4	Start	156,318,367 bp
Band	X|X F4	End	156,381,711 bp
RNA expression pattern
Bgee	Human / Mouse (ortholog); Top expressed in: endothelial cell; tibia; parietal pleura; retinal pigment epithelium; Brodmann area 23; decidua; visceral pleura; germinal epithelium; parotid gland; Skeletal muscle tissue of biceps brachii / Top expressed in: superior cervical ganglion; retinal pigment epithelium; hand; otolith organ; utricle; trigeminal ganglion; foot; ciliary body; Epithelium of choroid plexus; secondary oocyte; More reference expression data
BioGPS	n/a
Gene ontology
Molecular function	peptidase activity; hydrolase activity; metal ion binding; metalloendopeptidase activity; metallopeptidase activity
Cellular component	cytoplasm; integral component of membrane; Golgi membrane; membrane; endoplasmic reticulum membrane
Biological process	ATF6-mediated unfolded protein response; steroid metabolic process; positive regulation of DNA-binding transcription factor activity; cholesterol metabolic process; membrane protein intracellular domain proteolysis; response to endoplasmic reticulum stress; proteolysis; lipid metabolism; positive regulation of transcription from RNA polymerase II promoter in response to endoplasmic reticulum stress; endoplasmic reticulum unfolded protein response; regulation of cholesterol biosynthetic process; bone maturation
Sources:Amigo / QuickGO
Orthologs
Species	Human	Mouse
Entrez	51360	270669
Ensembl	ENSG00000012174	ENSMUSG00000046873
UniProt	O43462	Q8CHX6
RefSeq (mRNA)	NM_015884	NM_172307; NM_178266
RefSeq (protein)	NP_056968	NP_758511
Location (UCSC)	Chr X: 21.84 – 21.89 Mb	Chr X: 156.32 – 156.38 Mb
PubMed search
- Wikidata
View/Edit Human	View/Edit Mouse

membrane-bound transcription factor peptidase, site 2

Identifiers
- Symbol: MBTPS2
- Alt. symbols: S2P
- NCBI gene: 51360
- HGNC: 15455
- OMIM: 300294
- RefSeq: NM_015884
- UniProt: O43462

Other data
- EC number: 3.4.24.85
- Locus: Chr. X p22.1-p22.2
Search for
- Structures: Swiss-model
- Domains: InterPro

S2P endopeptidase

Identifiers
- EC no.: 3.4.24.85
- CAS no.: 752251-31-3

Databases
- IntEnz: IntEnz view
- BRENDA: BRENDA entry
- ExPASy: NiceZyme view
- KEGG: KEGG entry
- MetaCyc: metabolic pathway
- PRIAM: profile
- PDB structures: RCSB PDB PDBe PDBsum
Search
- PMC: articles
- PubMed: articles
- NCBI: proteins

Membrane-bound transcription factor site-2 protease, also known as S2P endopeptidase or site-2 protease (S2P), is an enzyme (EC 3.4.24.85) encoded by the MBTPS2 gene which liberates the N-terminal fragment of sterol regulatory element-binding protein (SREBP) transcription factors from membranes. S2P cleaves the transmembrane domain of SREBP, making it a member of the class of intramembrane proteases.

S2P catalyses the following chemical reaction

Cleaves several transcription factors that are type-2 transmembrane proteins within membrane-spanning domains. Known substrates include sterol regulatory element-binding protein (SREBP)-1, SREBP-2 and forms of the transcriptional activator ATF6.

This enzyme belongs to the peptidase family M50.

== Function ==
This gene encodes an intramembrane zinc metalloprotease, which is essential in development. This protease functions in the signal protein activation involved in sterol control of transcription and the ER stress response. Mutations in this gene have been associated with ichthyosis follicularis with atrichia and photophobia (IFAP syndrome); IFAP syndrome has been quantitatively linked to a reduction in cholesterol homeostasis and ER stress response.[provided by RefSeq, Aug 2009].

== See also ==
- Membrane-bound transcription factor site-1 protease
