= SNAP-94847 =

Chemical compound

Identifiers
- IUPAC name: N-(3-[1-([4-(3,4-difluorophenoxy)phenyl]methyl)(4-piperidyl)]-4-methylphenyl)-2-methylpropanamide
- CAS Number: 487051-12-7
- PubChem CID: 16756754
- ChemSpider: 10795817
- ChEMBL: ChEMBL242004
- ECHA InfoCard: 100.230.605

Chemical and physical data
- Formula: C_{29}H_{32}F_{2}N_{2}O_{2}
- Molar mass: 478.584 g·mol^{−1}
- 3D model (JSmol): Interactive image
- SMILES: Fc1ccc(cc1F)Oc(cc4)ccc4CN(CC3)CCC3c2cc(NC(=O)C(C)C)ccc2C
- InChI: InChI=1S/C29H32F2N2O2/c1-19(2)29(34)32-23-7-4-20(3)26(16-23)22-12-14-33(15-13-22)18-21-5-8-24(9-6-21)35-25-10-11-27(30)28(31)17-25/h4-11,16-17,19,22H,12-15,18H2,1-3H3,(H,32,34); Key:VMLZFUVIKCGATC-UHFFFAOYSA-N

SNAP-94847 is a drug used in scientific research, which is a selective, non-peptide antagonist at the melanin concentrating hormone receptor MCH_{1}. In animal studies it has been shown to produce both anxiolytic and antidepressant effects, and also reduces food consumption suggesting a possible anorectic effect.
