= NGD-4715 =

Chemical compound

Identifiers
- CAS Number: 873318-96-8
- CompTox Dashboard (EPA): DTXSID601101895

Chemical and physical data
- Formula: C_{25}H_{30}F_{3}N_{3}O_{3}
- Molar mass: 477.528 g·mol^{−1}
- 3D model (JSmol): Interactive image
- SMILES: [H][C@@]12CCC[C@@H](N1CCN(C2)C(=O)C1=CC=C(N=C1)C(F)(F)F)C1=CC=C(OCCO)C(C)=C1C

NGD-4715 is a drug that was developed by Neurogen, which acts as a selective, non-peptide antagonist at the melanin concentrating hormone receptor MCH_{1}. In animal models, it has anxiolytic, antidepressant, and anorectic effects, and it has successfully passed Phase I of clinical trials in humans.

Neurogen was acquired by Ligand Pharmaceuticals in August, 2009, and NGD-4715 was not listed among its key assets. All four laboratories were closed and sold, and no employees were retained.

The structure of NGD-4715 is often confused with, for example 1-(5-bromo-6-methoxypyridin-2-yl)-4-(3,4-dimethoxybenzyl)piperazine.
