= Melanin-concentrating hormone receptor =

InterPro Family

melanin-concentrating hormone receptor 1

Identifiers
- Symbol: MCHR1
- Alt. symbols: GPR24
- NCBI gene: 2847
- HGNC: 4479
- OMIM: 601751
- RefSeq: NM_005297
- UniProt: Q99705

Other data
- Locus: Chr. 22 q13.3
Search for
- Structures: Swiss-model
- Domains: InterPro

melanin-concentrating hormone receptor 2

Identifiers
- Symbol: MCHR2
- Alt. symbols: GPR145
- NCBI gene: 84539
- HGNC: 20867
- OMIM: 606111
- RefSeq: NM_032503
- UniProt: Q969V1

Other data
- Locus: Chr. 6 q16
Search for
- Structures: Swiss-model
- Domains: InterPro

Two Melanin-concentrating hormone receptors (MCHR) have recently been characterized: MCH-R1 and MCH-R2. These two receptors share approximately 38% homology.

- MCH-R1 is expressed in all mammals.
- MCH-R2 is only found in some primates and carnivores including dogs, ferrets and humans.

== Clinical significance ==
Antagonists might be useful in the treatment of obesity and anxiety and depression. An agonist might have possible utility as a treatment for osteoporosis and insomnia

Research is ongoing for antagonists affecting MCH receptors R1 and R2.

== See also ==
- Melanin concentrating hormone
- Melanin
