= Melanin-concentrating hormone receptor 2 =

Protein-coding gene in the species Homo sapiens

MCHR2

Identifiers
- Aliases: MCHR2, GPR145, GPRv17, MCH-2R, MCH-R2, MCH2, MCH2R, MCHR-2, SLT, melanin concentrating hormone receptor 2
- External IDs: OMIM: 606111; GeneCards: MCHR2

Gene location (Human)
Chr.	Chromosome 6 (human)
Band	6q16.2	Start	99,918,519 bp
Band	6q16.2	End	99,994,247 bp
RNA expression pattern
Bgee	Human / Mouse (ortholog); Top expressed in: prefrontal cortex; dorsolateral prefrontal cortex; Brodmann area 9; Brodmann area 46; testicle; right frontal lobe; superior frontal gyrus; anterior cingulate cortex; primary visual cortex; postcentral gyrus / n/a; More reference expression data
BioGPS	n/a
Gene ontology
Molecular function	G protein-coupled peptide receptor activity; G protein-coupled receptor activity; signal transducer activity
Cellular component	integral component of membrane; plasma membrane; integral component of plasma membrane; membrane
Biological process	phospholipase C-activating G protein-coupled receptor signaling pathway; neuropeptide signaling pathway; signal transduction; G protein-coupled receptor signaling pathway
Sources:Amigo / QuickGO
Orthologs
Databases	NCBI: entry; OMA: entry
Species	Human	Mouse
Entrez	84539	n/a
Ensembl	ENSG00000152034	n/a
UniProt	Q969V1	n/a
RefSeq (mRNA)	NM_032503; NM_001040179	n/a
RefSeq (protein)	NP_001035269; NP_115892	n/a
Location (UCSC)	Chr 6: 99.92 – 99.99 Mb	n/a
PubMed search		n/a
- Wikidata
View/Edit Human

Melanin-concentrating hormone receptor 2 (MCH_{2}) also known as G-protein coupled receptor 145 (GPR145) is a protein that in humans is encoded by the MCHR2 gene.

MCH_{2} is also found in dogs, ferrets, and some other primates and carnivores, but is not found in mice or rats. This has delayed research into the receptor as a therapeutic target, due to most early pharmaceutical research usually being conducted in small mammals such as mice, rats or rabbits which lack the MCH_{2} gene and its receptor product.

== Clinical significance ==
Treatment of human cells expressing MCHR2 with MCH resulted in upregulation of IDH3A, PCK1 and PFKFB4 and the downregulation of INSIG2 and ACOT8.

== See also ==
- Melanin-concentrating hormone receptor
