= PTCH2 =

Protein-coding gene in humans

Identifiers
- Aliases: PTCH2, PTC2, patched 2
- External IDs: OMIM: 603673; MGI: 1095405; GeneCards: PTCH2

Gene location (Mouse)
Chr.	Chromosome 4 (mouse)
Band	4 D1|4 53.41 cM	Start	116,953,272 bp
Band	4 D1|4 53.41 cM	End	116,973,298 bp
RNA expression pattern
Bgee	Human / Mouse (ortholog); Top expressed in: tibial nerve; sural nerve; anterior pituitary; right uterine tube; nucleus accumbens; right adrenal gland; Brodmann area 9; gastric mucosa; right coronary artery; left uterine tube / Top expressed in: ciliary body; hair follicle; parotid gland; molar; internal carotid artery; external carotid artery; ankle; subiculum; intercostal muscle; carotid body; More reference expression data
BioGPS	n/a
Gene ontology
Molecular function	hedgehog receptor activity; hedgehog family protein binding; smoothened binding
Cellular component	membrane; integral component of membrane; plasma membrane
Biological process	skin development; positive regulation of epidermal cell differentiation; hair cycle; epidermal cell fate specification; cell fate determination; negative regulation of smoothened signaling pathway; epidermis development; signal transduction; smoothened signaling pathway; regulation of cell growth
Sources:Amigo / QuickGO
Orthologs
Databases	NCBI: entry; OMA: entry
Species	Human	Mouse
Entrez	8643	19207
Ensembl	ENSG00000117425	ENSMUSG00000028681
UniProt	Q9Y6C5	O35595
RefSeq (mRNA)	NM_003738; NM_001166292	NM_008958; NM_001312903
RefSeq (protein)	NP_001159764; NP_003729	NP_001299832; NP_032984
Location (UCSC)	n/a	Chr 4: 116.95 – 116.97 Mb
PubMed search
- Wikidata
View/Edit Human	View/Edit Mouse

Patched 2 is a protein that in humans is encoded by the PTCH2 gene.

== Function ==
This gene encodes a transmembrane receptor of the patched gene family. The encoded protein may function as a tumor suppressor in the hedgehog signaling pathway.

== Clinical significance ==
Alterations in this gene have been associated with nevoid basal cell carcinoma syndrome, basal cell carcinoma, medulloblastoma, and susceptibility to congenital macrostomia.
