= Patched =

Transmembrane protein receptor

patched 1

Identifiers
- Symbol: PTCH1
- Alt. symbols: NBCCS, PTCH
- NCBI gene: 5727
- HGNC: 9585
- OMIM: 601309
- RefSeq: NM_000264
- UniProt: Q13635

Other data
- Locus: Chr. 9 q22.1q31
Search for
- Structures: Swiss-model
- Domains: InterPro

patched 2

Identifiers
- Symbol: PTCH2
- NCBI gene: 8643
- HGNC: 9586
- OMIM: 603673
- RefSeq: NM_003738
- UniProt: Q9Y6C5

Other data
- Locus: Chr. 1 p34.1
Search for
- Structures: Swiss-model
- Domains: InterPro

Patched (Ptc) is a conserved 12-pass transmembrane protein receptor that plays an obligate negative regulatory role in the Hedgehog signaling pathway in insects and vertebrates. Patched is an essential gene in embryogenesis for proper segmentation in the fly embryo, mutations in which may be embryonic lethal. Patched functions as the receptor for the Hedgehog protein and controls its spatial distribution, in part via endocytosis of bound Hedgehog protein, which is then targeted for lysosomal degradation.

== Discovery ==
The original mutations in the ptc gene were discovered in the fruit fly Drosophila melanogaster by 1995 Nobel Laureates Eric F. Wieschaus and Christiane Nusslein-Volhard and colleagues, and the gene was independently cloned in 1989 by Joan Hooper in the laboratory of Matthew P. Scott, and by Philip Ingham and colleagues.

== Role in hedgehog signaling ==
Patched is part of a negative feedback mechanism for hedgehog signaling that helps shape the spatial gradient of signaling activity across tissues. In the absence of hedgehog, low levels of patched are sufficient to suppress activity of the signal transduction pathway. When hedgehog is present, its cholesterol moiety binds to the sterol-sensing domain in patched, which then inhibits the activity of smoothened. Smoothened is a G protein-coupled receptor, most of which is stored in membrane bound vesicles internally within the cell and which increases at the cell surface when hedgehog is present. Smoothened must be present on the cell membrane in order for the Hedgehog signaling pathway to be activated. Among other genes, the transcription of the patched gene is induced by hedgehog signaling, with the accumulation of the patched protein limiting signaling through the Smoothened protein. Recent work implicates the cilium in intracellular trafficking of hedgehog signaling components in vertebrate cells.

== Role in disease ==
Mutated patched proteins have been implicated in a number of cancers including basal cell carcinoma, medulloblastoma, and rhabdomyosarcoma. Hereditary mutations in the human patched homolog PTCH1 cause autosomal dominant Gorlin syndrome, which consists of overgrowth and hereditary disposition to cancer including basal cell carcinoma and medulloblastoma. Mice with mutations in mouse PTCH1 similarly develop medulloblastoma.
