= Sterol regulatory element–binding protein 2 =

Protein-coding gene in the species Homo sapiens

SREBF2
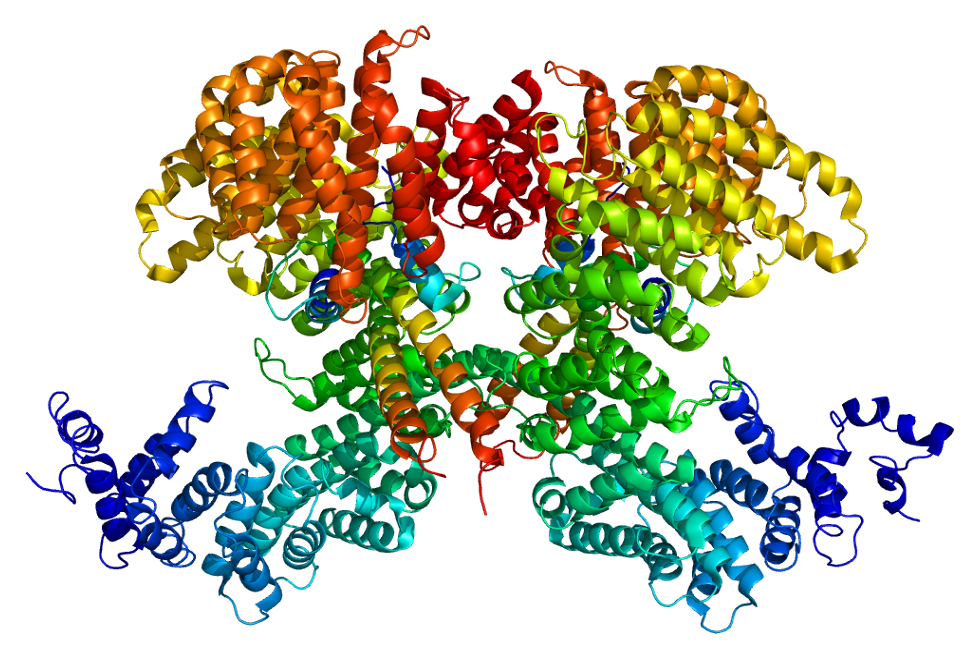

Identifiers
- Aliases: SREBF2, SREBP-2, SREBP2, bHLHd2, sterol regulatory element binding transcription factor 2
- External IDs: OMIM: 600481; MGI: 107585; GeneCards: SREBF2
Available structures
PDB	Ortholog search: PDBe RCSB
PDB	List of PDB id codes 1UKL

Gene location (Human)
Chr.	Chromosome 22 (human)
Band	22q13.2	Start	41,833,079 bp
Band	22q13.2	End	41,907,307 bp

Gene location (Mouse)
Chr.	Chromosome 15 (mouse)
Band	15|15 E1	Start	82,031,382 bp
Band	15|15 E1	End	82,089,580 bp
RNA expression pattern
Bgee	Human / Mouse (ortholog); Top expressed in: ganglionic eminence; ventricular zone; right hemisphere of cerebellum; right adrenal cortex; left adrenal cortex; right frontal lobe; tibial nerve; prefrontal cortex; cingulate gyrus; mucosa of transverse colon / Top expressed in: ventricular zone; lip; superior frontal gyrus; primary visual cortex; dentate gyrus of hippocampal formation granule cell; neural tube; yolk sac; granulocyte; neural layer of retina; tail of embryo; More reference expression data
BioGPS	n/a
Gene ontology
Molecular function	C-8 sterol isomerase activity; DNA binding; protein dimerization activity; DNA-binding transcription factor activity; RNA polymerase II cis-regulatory region sequence-specific DNA binding; DNA-binding transcription repressor activity, RNA polymerase II-specific; E-box binding; protein C-terminus binding; protein binding; DNA-binding transcription factor activity, RNA polymerase II-specific
Cellular component	cytoplasm; integral component of membrane; cytosol; SREBP-SCAP-Insig complex; Golgi apparatus; endoplasmic reticulum membrane; membrane; Golgi membrane; endoplasmic reticulum; ER to Golgi transport vesicle membrane; cytoplasmic vesicle; nucleus; nucleoplasm; mitochondrion; intracellular membrane-bounded organelle
Biological process	steroid metabolic process; regulation of transcription, DNA-templated; positive regulation of protein targeting to mitochondrion; lipid metabolism; positive regulation of cholesterol storage; cellular response to laminar fluid shear stress; cellular response to starvation; cholesterol metabolic process; negative regulation of transcription by RNA polymerase II; transcription, DNA-templated; regulation of autophagy of mitochondrion; negative regulation of cholesterol efflux; positive regulation of transcription by RNA polymerase II; regulation of cholesterol biosynthetic process; cellular response to low-density lipoprotein particle stimulus
Sources:Amigo / QuickGO
Orthologs
Databases	NCBI: entry; OMA: entry
Species	Human	Mouse
Entrez	6721	20788
Ensembl	ENSG00000198911	ENSMUSG00000022463
UniProt	Q12772	Q3U1N2
RefSeq (mRNA)	NM_004599	NM_033218
RefSeq (protein)	NP_004590	NP_150087
Location (UCSC)	Chr 22: 41.83 – 41.91 Mb	Chr 15: 82.03 – 82.09 Mb
PubMed search
- Wikidata
View/Edit Human	View/Edit Mouse

Sterol regulatory element-binding protein 2 (SREBP-2) also known as sterol regulatory element binding transcription factor 2 (SREBF2) is a protein that in humans is encoded by the SREBF2 gene.

== Function ==
This gene encodes a ubiquitously expressed transcription factor that controls cholesterol homeostasis by stimulating transcription of sterol-regulated genes. The encoded protein contains a basic helix-loop-helix leucine zipper (bHLH-Zip) domain. Various single nucleotide polymorphisms (SNPs) of the SREBF2 have been identified and some of them are found to be associated with higher risk of knee osteoarthritis.

== Interactions ==
SREBF2 has been shown to interact with INSIG1 and the CREB-binding protein.

== See also ==
- Sterol regulatory element-binding protein
