= SAP1a =

SAP1A is one of a family of proteins that contains a unique DNA binding domain termed the ETS domain.

== Transcription ==
The transcriptional activation domain of SAP1a resides within the C-terminal region, the function of which may be impeded by the N-terminus. Several potential ERK consensus sites within the C-terminal region of SAP1a can modulate its transactivation efficacy, implicating that SAP1a is a direct target of ERKs.

== Interactions ==
SAP1a has been shown to interact with the c-fos serum response element upon recruitment by the serum response factor.

SAP1a is a nuclear protein stimulating transcription via the c-fos serum response element, and additionally via an Ets binding site independently of the serum response factor.

Insulin activated the human INSIG2 promoter in a process mediated by phosphorylated SAP1a.

Sap1a is phosphorylated efficiently by ERKs but not by SAPK/JNKs. Serum response factor-dependent ternary complex formation by Sap1a is stimulated by ERK phosphorylation but not by SAPK/JNKs. Moreover, Sap1a-mediated transcription is activated by mitogenic signals but not by cell stress.

ELK1 and SAP1a have been shown to form ternary complexes with SRF on the serum response elements (SRE) located in the c-fos promoter. ELK1, SAPla, FLI1 and EWS-FLI1 are able to form ternary complexes with SRF on EGR1 SREs. In addition, ELK1 and SAP1a can also form quaternary complexes on the Egr1 SREI.

== Clinical significance ==
SAP1a activation by ERK may play an important role in the transformation of extracellular stimuli into a nuclear response.
