= Macrostomia =

Unusually wide mouth

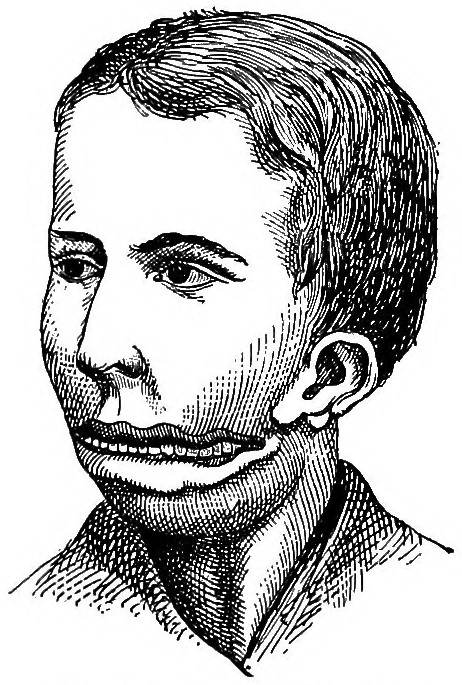
- Macrostomia from bilateral mouth fissures
- Specialty: Medical genetics

Macrostomia refers to a mouth that is unusually wide. The term is from the Greek prefix makro- meaning "large" and from Greek στόμα, "mouth".

Macrostomia is characterized as a physical abnormality that causes clefts to form on the face of affected individuals. These clefts can form on either or both sides of the face, but they are most commonly seen on the right cheek and have a higher rate of occurrence in males. Macrostomia is very irregular and on average occurs only once in every 150,000 to 300,000 live births. It's unusual for macrostomia to occur on its own and it is included as a symptom for many diseases including craniofacial microsomia. The clefts result from improper development and fusion of the mandibular and maxillary processes. The clefts cause problems with facial muscle development. The origin of macrostomia is not yet fully understood: it could have multiple causes.

== Phenotypic variations ==
There are 4 distinct variations of macrostomia. Classifications are a complete lateral facial cleft, simple macrostomia, macrostomia with diastasis of the facial musculature, and isolated facial musculature diastasis. Each has a different physical appearance with varying levels of severity.

The cleft associated with macrostomia is associated with improper or failed fusion of the mandibular and maxillary processes during embryonic development. This can lead to a variety of abnormalities involving skin, subcutaneous tissue, facial muscles, and the mucous membrane. The severity of each abnormality can vary from minor to severe. Environmental contaminants may play a role in causing macrostomia. Many affected individuals were found in Lagos, an industrial area of Nigeria, where water supplies are known to be contaminated by improper disposal of industrial and domestic waste.

=== Complete lateral facial cleft ===
The facial cleft runs from the corner of the mouth towards the bottom of the ear. The outside of the ear on the affected side of the face appears as normal and a region of soft tissue connects the cleft to the right lateral posterior hard palate. Internally there is no soft palate.

=== Simple macrostomia ===
This version of macrostomia is less severe because it does not affect the facial muscles and is not associated with any soft tissue or bone deformities. A small cleft(s) extends from the mouth and can be repaired surgically.

=== Diastasis of the facial musculature ===
Clefts in this variant are slightly more severe than the ones seen in simple macrostomia. It also does not have bone deformities, but it does include minor soft tissue deformities. The defining feature is muscle diastasis which is separation of the masseter. This phenotype can also be partially corrected with surgery.

=== Isolated facial musculature diastasis ===
The facial cleft in this case results in a more severe muscle separation even though there is not a true open cleft. Bones in the region remain unaffected and the phenotype appears as an indentation of the cheek rather than an open cleft. The external ear in this phenotype can also be deformed.

== Mechanism ==
Likely due to the complexity of macrostomia, many theories have been provided over time in an attempt to define its origin. There is no definitive mechanism to explain its development but it is likely that there are interactions between genes and the environment resulting in improper development of the first and sometimes second brachial arch.

=== Genetic ===
Macrostomia can be partially classified as a heritable autosomal dominant disease. The responsible mutation is found on the short arm of chromosome 1 in locations 32-34 (1p32-1p34). The mutation is heterozygous meaning that it only occurs in one allele. A single base substitution in the 11th coding region of the gene PTCH2 changes an adenine to guanine. This results in a valine being incorporated instead of an isoleucine at the 147th position during translation of the resulting transmembrane protein (Val147Ile).

The transmembrane protein encoded by PTCH2 is 1204 amino acids long and is involved with inhibiting the sonic hedgehog signalling pathway that is involved with development. PTCH2 inhibits the smooth frizzled class receptor (SMO) which when active is responsible for increasing transcription rates of many genes involved with development and differentiation. PTCH2 (Val147Ile) is a loss of function mutation which results in a lack of control of cell growth during development and links it to macrostomia.
