= Melanin-concentrating hormone =

Protein-coding gene in the species Homo sapiens

PMCH

Identifiers
- Aliases: PMCH, Melanin-concentrating hormone, MCH, ppMCH, pro-melanin concentrating hormone
- External IDs: OMIM: 176795; MGI: 97629; GeneCards: PMCH

Gene location (Human)
Chr.	Chromosome 12 (human)
Band	12q23.2	Start	102,196,459 bp
Band	12q23.2	End	102,197,833 bp

Gene location (Mouse)
Chr.	Chromosome 10 (mouse)
Band	10 C1|10 43.7 cM	Start	87,926,934 bp
Band	10 C1|10 43.7 cM	End	87,928,237 bp
RNA expression pattern
Bgee	Human / Mouse (ortholog); Top expressed in: hypothalamus; gonad; testicle; cartilage tissue; gastric mucosa; mucosa of urinary bladder; lymph node; substantia nigra; amygdala; bone marrow / Top expressed in: dorsomedial hypothalamic nucleus; paraventricular nucleus of hypothalamus; ventromedial nucleus; ventral tegmental area; cumulus cell; nucleus of stria terminalis; gastrula; morula; spermatocyte; embryo; More reference expression data
BioGPS	n/a
Gene ontology
Molecular function	melanin-concentrating hormone activity; hormone activity; type 1 melanin-concentrating hormone receptor binding
Cellular component	extracellular region; nucleus
Biological process	multicellular organism development; cell differentiation; neuropeptide signaling pathway; feeding behavior; spermatogenesis; chemical synaptic transmission; regulation of signaling receptor activity; G protein-coupled receptor signaling pathway
Sources:Amigo / QuickGO
Orthologs
Databases	NCBI: entry; OMA: entry
Species	Human	Mouse
Entrez	5367	110312
Ensembl	ENSG00000183395	ENSMUSG00000035383
UniProt	P20382	P56942
RefSeq (mRNA)	NM_002674	NM_029971
RefSeq (protein)	NP_002665	NP_084247
Location (UCSC)	Chr 12: 102.2 – 102.2 Mb	Chr 10: 87.93 – 87.93 Mb
PubMed search
- Wikidata
View/Edit Human	View/Edit Mouse

Melanin-concentrating hormone (MCH), also known as pro-melanin stimulating hormone (PMCH), is a cyclic 19-amino acid orexigenic hypothalamic peptide originally isolated from the pituitary gland of teleost fish, where it controls skin pigmentation. In mammals it is involved in the regulation of feeding behavior, mood, sleep-wake cycle and energy balance.

== Structure ==
MCH is a cyclic 19-amino acid neuropeptide, as it is a polypeptide chain that is able to act as a neurotransmitter. MCH neurons are mainly concentrated in the lateral hypothalamic area, zona incerta, and the incerto-hypothalamic area, but they are also located, in much smaller amounts, in the paramedian pontine reticular formation (PPRF), medial preoptic area, laterodorsal tegmental nucleus, and the olfactory tubercle. MCH is activated by binding to two G-coupled protein receptors (GCPRs), MCHR1 and MCHR2. MCHR2 has only been identified in certain species such as humans, dogs, ferrets, and rhesus monkeys, while other mammals such as rodents and rabbits do not have the receptor. MCH is cleaved from prepro-MCH (ppMCH), a 165 amino acid polypeptide which also contains the neuropeptides GE and EI.

== Tissue distribution ==
MCH has also been found in peripheral structures outside of the brain. Both the spleen and thymus have shown significant levels of MCH in mammals in multiple studies. The bloodstream seems to carry MCH around the body in mammals as well, though it is a very amount in humans.

MCH is found in the laterodorsal tegmental nucleus solely in female brains in rat models. MCH has also only been found in the medial preoptic area and the paraventricular hypothalamic nucleus during lactation.

== Activation and deactivation ==
MCH neurons depolarize in response to high glucose concentrations. This mechanism seems to be related to glucose being used as a reactant to form ATP, which also causes MCH neurons to depolarize. The neurotransmitter, glutamate, also causes MCH neurons to depolarize, while another neurotransmitter, GABA, causes MCH neurons to hyperpolarize. Orexin also depolarizes MCH neurons. MCH neurons seems to have an inhibitory response to MCH, but does not cause the neurons to become hyperpolarized. Norepinephrine has an inhibitory effect on MCH neurons as does acetylcholine. MCH neurons hyperpolarize in response to serotonin. Cannabinoids have an excitatory effect on MCH neurons.

Some research has shown that dopamine has an inhibitory effect on MCH neurons, but further research is needed to fully characterize this interaction.

== Function ==
=== Sleep ===
MCH and the hormone orexin have an antagonistic relationship with one another with regards to the sleep cycle, with orexin being almost entirely active during wake periods and MCH being more active during sleep periods. MCH also promotes sleep, and within a sleep period increased levels of MCH seem to increase the amount of time spent in REM sleep and slow waves sleep. Increased levels of MCH can also increase the amount of time spent in both REM and NREM, which in turn increases total sleep duration. Increased levels of sugar promotes MCH and its effect on sleep and conserving energy.

=== Maternal behavior ===
The presence of MCH in specific locations solely during lactation is thought to help to promote maternal behavior in individuals.

=== Eating behaviors and energy conservation ===
An increased presence of MCH can cause increased eating levels and has been linked to an increase in body mass. Inversely, a decrease in the amount of MCH present can cause decreased levels in eating. Increased amounts of MCH in olfactory regions, among others, have also been linked to an increased intake of fatty foods with high caloric content. Food that is found to taste good also seems to promote MCH, which reinforces the eating of that food. Sugar, specifically glucose, seems to promote MCH's role in sleep and energy conservation. This promoting of energy conservation has also been linked to higher body mass even when diet is controlled.

=== Reproduction ===
It has been postulated that MCH has a modulatory role with the release of Luteinizing Hormone (LH) either by directly acting on the pituitary gland or indirectly by affecting Gonadotropin-releasing hormone (GNRH) in the hypothalamus. Estrogen seems to be necessary in order for MCH to affect reproduction.

=== Skin pigmentation ===
Though MCH was initially discovered for its role in determining pigmentation levels in fish, determining MCH's role in mammalian skin pigmentation has been much more difficult. However, MCHR1 has been found in human melanocytes and some melanoma cells, so MCH is able to bind to these cells as well as keratinocytes though they do not express MCHR1. In melanocytes, MCH seems to have an antagonistic relationship with α-MSH, and decreased melanin production. Though, more information is needed to fully understand MCH's relationship with skin pigmentation in mammals.

== Clinical significance ==
=== Narcolepsy ===
While MCH does promote sleep, there has been no research that links MCH to narcolepsy. Research has instead found that in individuals with narcolepsy there is a decrease in orexin neurons, which would promote wakefulness, while the number of MCH neurons do not vary from the average non-narcoleptic individual.

=== Depression and anxiety ===
MCH has been linked to depression and anxiety. MCHR1 antagonists have been shown to act as antidepressants.

=== Anorexia ===
Interactions between MCH and chemokines/cytokines that lead to an overall decrease in MCH release and neuron excitability has been linked with infection-induced anorexia. Chemokines and cytokines often appear as the result of inflammation or infection, and they can then damage MCH neurons, which can lead to anorexia in an individual.

=== Skin cancers ===
MCH has been identified in both melanoma and squamous cell carcinoma cell lines. However, pro-MCH, a precursor to MCH, has not been found in melanocytes, keratinocytes, or fibroblasts, which might indicate MCH might be brought into these cells by macrophages as part of the immune response. More research is needed to fully determine and understand any relationship between MCH and possible immune responses in skin.

== History ==
MCH was initially discovered in the teleost fish; it was found to help determine the fish's skin color. Later, a mammalian version of MCH was discovered in rats, where most of the functions and localizations are conserved across mammalian species.

== See also ==
- Melanin-concentrating hormone receptor (MCHR)
- Melanin-concentrating hormone receptor 1 (MCHR1)
- Melanin-concentrating hormone receptor 2 (MCHR2)
- Orexin (OX)
