= SREBP cleavage-activating protein =

Protein-coding gene in the species Homo sapiens

SCAP

Identifiers
- Aliases: SCAP, entrez:22937, SREBF chaperone
- External IDs: OMIM: 601510; MGI: 2135958; GeneCards: SCAP

Gene location (Human)
Chr.	Chromosome 3 (human)
Band	3p21.31	Start	47,413,681 bp
Band	3p21.31	End	47,477,126 bp

Gene location (Mouse)
Chr.	Chromosome 9 (mouse)
Band	9 F2|9 59.91 cM	Start	110,162,356 bp
Band	9 F2|9 59.91 cM	End	110,214,018 bp
RNA expression pattern
Bgee	Human / Mouse (ortholog); Top expressed in: right adrenal cortex; left adrenal cortex; mucosa of transverse colon; right lobe of liver; skin of abdomen; skin of leg; right hemisphere of cerebellum; right ovary; left ovary; right testis / Top expressed in: retinal pigment epithelium; secondary oocyte; otic vesicle; primary oocyte; zygote; saccule; transitional epithelium of urinary bladder; epithelium of stomach; otic placode; left lobe of liver; More reference expression data
BioGPS	n/a
Gene ontology
Molecular function	protein binding; cholesterol binding; unfolded protein binding; protein-containing complex binding; sterol binding
Cellular component	endoplasmic reticulum membrane; ER to Golgi transport vesicle membrane; integral component of membrane; Golgi apparatus; membrane; intracellular membrane-bounded organelle; Golgi membrane; endoplasmic reticulum; cytoplasmic vesicle; protein-containing complex
Biological process	response to hypoxia; ageing; cholesterol metabolic process; response to insulin; regulation of fatty acid biosynthetic process; negative regulation of cholesterol biosynthetic process; steroid metabolic process; lipid metabolism; regulation of fatty acid metabolic process; SREBP signaling pathway; regulation of cholesterol biosynthetic process; immune response; cellular lipid metabolic process
Sources:Amigo / QuickGO
Orthologs
Databases	NCBI: entry; OMA: entry
Species	Human	Mouse
Entrez	22937	235623
Ensembl	ENSG00000114650	ENSMUSG00000032485
UniProt	Q12770	Q6GQT6
RefSeq (mRNA)	NM_012235; NM_001320044	NM_001001144; NM_001103162
RefSeq (protein)	NP_001306973; NP_036367	NP_001001144; NP_001096632
Location (UCSC)	Chr 3: 47.41 – 47.48 Mb	Chr 9: 110.16 – 110.21 Mb
PubMed search
- Wikidata
View/Edit Human	View/Edit Mouse

Sterol regulatory element-binding protein cleavage-activating protein, also known as SREBP cleavage-activating protein or SCAP, is a protein that in humans is encoded by the SCAP gene.

SCAP contains a sterol-sensing domain (SSD) and seven WD domains. In cholesterol-depleted cells, this protein binds to sterol regulatory element binding proteins (SREBPs) and mediates their transport from the ER to the Golgi apparatus. The SREBPs are then proteolytically cleaved and stimulate sterol biosynthesis.

== Function ==
SCAP is a regulatory protein that is required for the proteolytic cleavage of the sterol regulatory element-binding protein (SREBP). SCAP is an integral membrane protein located in the endoplasmic reticulum (ER). One of the cytosolic regions of SCAP contains a hexapeptide amino acid sequence, MELADL, that functions to detect cellular cholesterol. When cholesterol is present, SCAP undergoes a conformational change that prevents it from activating SREBP and cholesterol synthesis does not occur.

== Structure ==
Scap has 8 transmembrane domains and both the N-terminal and C-terminal face the cytoplasm. Also, it binds SREBP by a series of consecutive WD repeats on its C-terminus.
